= Economy of the United States =

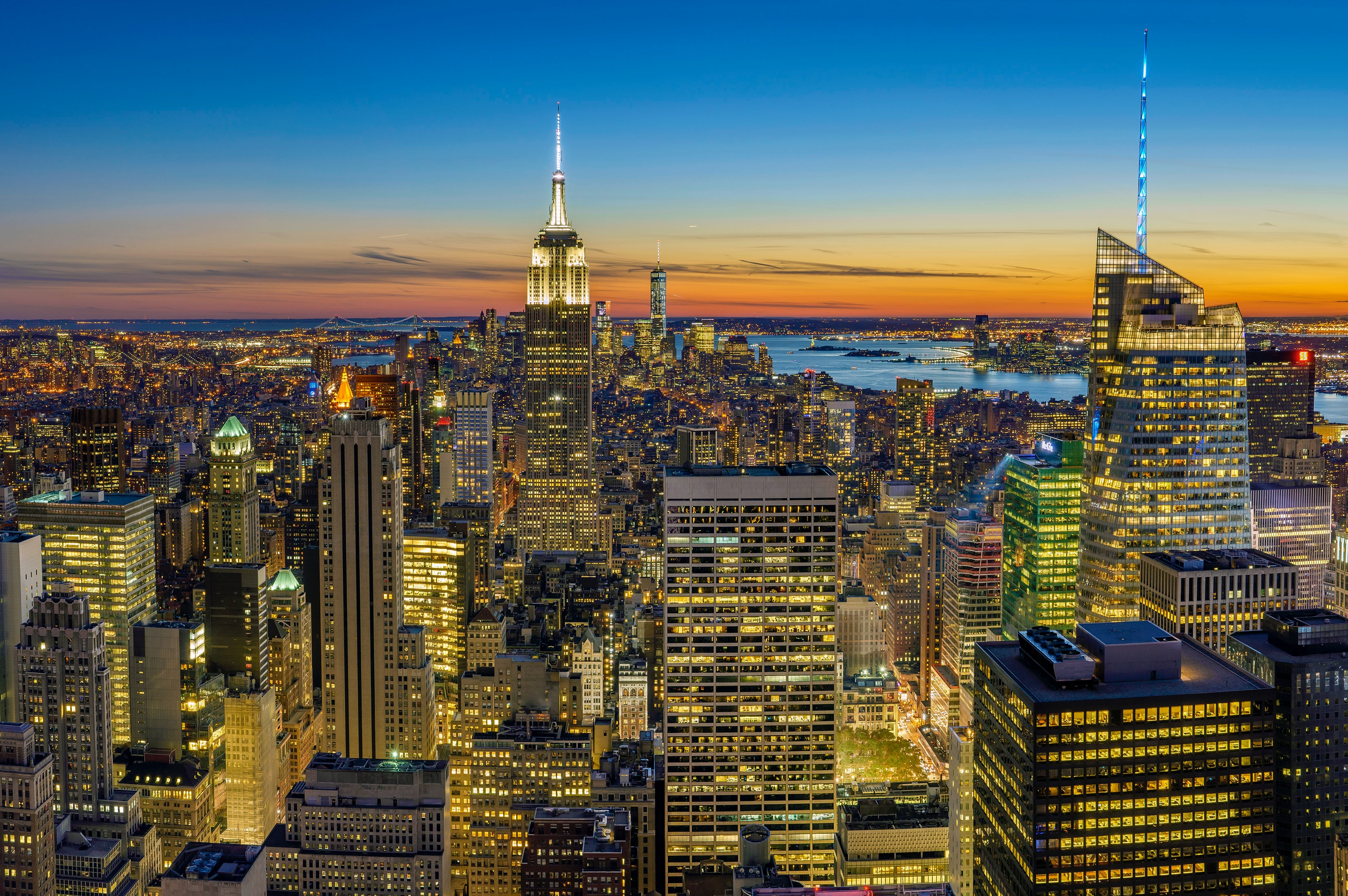
- New York City is considered the world's principal financial center and metropolitan economy.
- Currency: United States dollar (USD, $)
- Fiscal year: October 1 – September 30
- Trade organizations: WTO, G20, G7, OECD, USMCA, APEC and others
- Country group: Advanced economy; High-income economy

Statistics
- Population: ▲342,818,500 (2026)
- GDP: ▲$32.64 trillion (nominal; 2026); ▲$32.64 trillion (PPP; 2026)
- GDP rank: 1st (nominal; 2026); 2nd (PPP; 2026)
- GDP growth: 2.3% (2025); 2.3% (2026f); 2.3% (2027f)
- GDP per capita: ▲$95,212 (nominal; 2026); ▲$95,212 (PPP; 2026)
- GDP per capita rank: 8th (nominal; 2026); 11th (PPP; 2026)
- GDP per capita growth: ▼1.8% (2025)
- GDP by sector: Services: 76.4%; Industry: 17.6%; Agriculture: 5.9%; (2024)
- GDP by component: Household consumption: 67.9%; Government consumption: 17.3%; Investment in fixed capital: 17.5%; Investment in inventories: 0.2%; Exports of goods and services: 11.1%; Imports of goods and services: −14%; (2023 est.)
- Inflation (CPI): ▼3.4% (July 2026)
- Population below national poverty line: ▼10.6% (2024); ▼35.9 million (2024)
- Gini coefficient: ▼46.5 (2023, USCB); ▲41.8 (2023, World Bank); ▲44.3 (2021, CBO)
- Human Development Index: ▲0.938 (2023) (17th); ▲0.832 IHDI (29th) (2023)
- Corruption Perceptions Index: ▼65 out of 100 points (2024) (rank 28th)
- Labor force: 168,110,083 (2024); 62.6% employment rate (2024)
- Labor force by occupation: Agriculture: 1.0%; Industry: 19%; Services: 80%; (FY 2018)
- Unemployment: ▼4.1% (October 2026); ▼7.1 million unemployed (October 2026)
- Youth unemployment: ▼9.3% (October 2026; 16 to 24 year-olds)
- Average gross salary: $6,126, monthly (2025)
- Average net salary: $4,637, monthly (2025)
- Median income: $1,251 weekly (full-time, 2026)
- Wage growth: 0.8% (hourly, 2025)
- Final consumption expenditure: ▲85.2% of GDP (2023)
- Gross capital formation: ▲17.7% of GDP (2023)
- Yield curve: 10-year bond 4.28% (April 2025)
- Purchasing Managers' Index: ▲52.0 Manufacturing (May 2025); ▲53.7 Services (May 2025)
- Main industries
Further information
- High-technology
- petroleum
- steel
- motor vehicles
- aerospace
- telecommunications
- chemicals
- electronics
- agribusiness
- food processing
- information technology
- artificial intelligence
- consumer goods
- lumber
- retail
- healthcare
- financial services
- mining
- renewable energy
- quantum computing
- space technology
- defence
- biotechnology
- pharmaceutical

External
- Exports: ▲$3.430 trillion (2025)
- Export goods: Agricultural products 10.7%; Fuels and mining products 9.4%; Manufacturers 74.8%; Others 5.1%
- Main export partners: European Union 18.8%; Mexico 15.3%; Canada 15.3%; China 4.8%; United Kingdom 4.4%; Japan 3.7%; Other countries 37.7%
- Imports: ▲$4.361 trillion (2025)
- Import goods: Agricultural products 10.5%; Fuels and mining products 10.7%; Manufacturers 78.4%; Others 4.2%
- Main import partners: European Union 18.4%; Mexico 15.5%; Canada 11.1%; China 8.9%; Vietnam 5.6%; Japan 4.2%; Others 36.3%
- FDI stock: ▲ Inward: $367 billion (2021); ▲ Outward: $403 billion (2021)
- Current account: ▲ −$911.60 billion (2025); ▼ −2.93% of GDP (2025)
- Gross external debt: ▲$27 trillion (2023)

Public finance
- Government debt: ▲$40 trillion; ▲121% of GDP (2024)
- Foreign reserves: $250 billion (2024)
- Budget balance: ▼ −6.4% of GDP (2024)
- Revenue: $8.720 trillion 29.9% of GDP (2024)
- Spending: $10.945 trillion 37.5% of GDP (2024); U.S. government spending
- Economic aid: donor: ODA, $35.26 billion (2017)
- Credit rating: Standard & Poor's: AA+ (Domestic); AA+ (Foreign); AAA (T&C Assessment); Outlook: Stable; Moody's: Aa1; Outlook: Stable; Fitch: AA+; Outlook: Stable
- All values, unless otherwise stated, are in US dollars.

The United States has a highly developed and diversified market-oriented economy. It is the world's largest economy by nominal GDP, generating 26% of global economic output. It is the second-largest by purchasing power parity (PPP). On a per capita basis, the U.S. ranks ninth-highest nominal GDP per capita and 10th-highest GDP per capita by PPP. The U.S. dollar is the world's foremost reserve currency with widespread international usage and serve as reference standard for the petrodollar and eurodollar. Since the end of World War II, the U.S. economy has achieved relatively steady growth, low unemployment and inflation, along with rapid advances in technology. The American economy is fueled by high productivity, technology, well-developed transportation infrastructure, and extensive natural resources.

The United States is the second-largest manufacturer, with American manufacturing making up a fifth of the global total. The largest U.S. trading partners are Mexico, Canada, China, Japan, and Germany. The U.S. is the world's largest importer and second-largest exporter. It has free trade agreements with many countries. The country is the world's largest producer of petroleum, natural gas, and blood products. The U.S. has the world's largest consumer market. Within the American banking system, as of 2026, commercial banks maintain $25 trillion in assets. The nation maintains a large U.S. treasuries market and hosts the world's largest gold reserves. It is home to 139 of the 500 largest companies globally.

Americans have the sixth-highest average household and employee income among OECD member states. In 2026, they had the highest median household income among OECD countries, with one of the world's highest income inequalities among developed countries. The U.S. has the world's highest number of billionaires, with total wealth of $5.7 trillion. The U.S. has a highly flexible labor market and job security is relatively low. The nation's labor market has attracted immigrants from all over the world and its net migration is among the highest in the world. The U.S. has a highly efficient social security system; social expenditure stood at roughly 30% of GDP.

The NASDAQ and the New York Stock Exchange are the world's two largest stock exchanges by total market capitalization and volume of transactions of their listed companies. American capital markets are vast, with combined global equity and bond activity exceeding $134.7 trillion. It has ranked highly in global venture capital as well as research and development funding. The U.S. has spent around 3.46% of GDP on cutting-edge research and development across various sectors of the economy since 2023. Since the 1990s, consumer spending has comprised over 60% to 70% of the U.S. economy. The U.S. is one of the top-performing economies in studies on the ease of doing business index and global competitiveness.

== History ==
=== Colonial era and 18th century ===
The economic history of the United States traces back to British settlements along the Eastern seaboard in the 17th and 18th centuries. After 1700, the United States gained population rapidly, and imports as well as exports grew along with it. Africa, Asia, and most frequently Europe, contributed to the trade of the colonies. These 13 colonies gained independence from the British Empire in the late 18th century and quickly grew from colonial economies towards an economy focused on agriculture.

=== 19th century ===
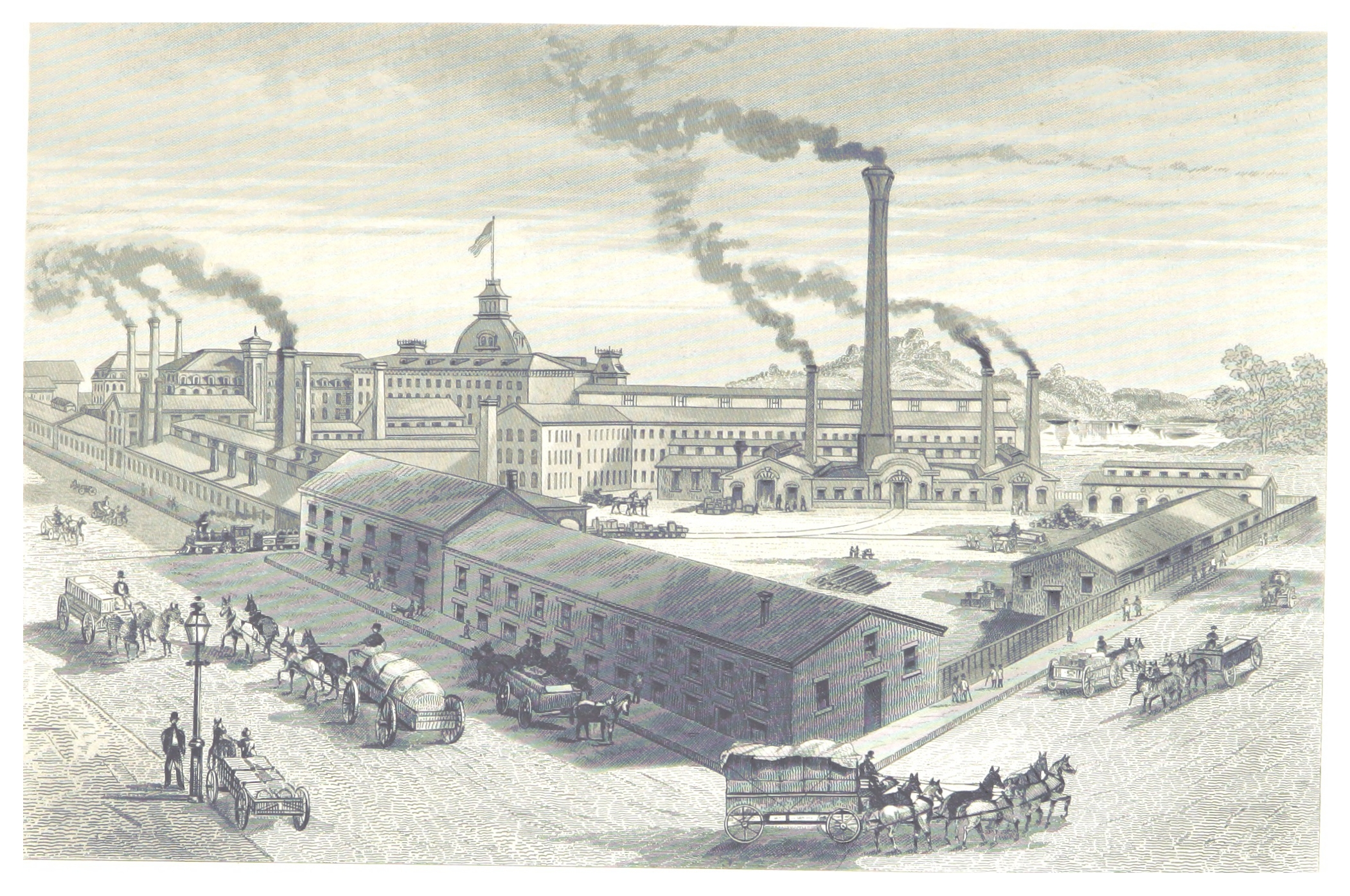
Washburn and Moen Manufacturing Company in Worcester, Massachusetts, 1876

In 180 years, the United States grew to become a huge, integrated, and industrialized economy, which made up about a fifth of the world economy. In that process, the U.S. GDP per capita rose past that of many other countries, supplanting the British Empire at the top. The economy maintained high wages, attracting immigrants by the millions from all over the world. In the 1820s and 1830s, mass production shifted much of the economy from artisans to factories. New government regulations strengthened patents.

Early in the 19th century, more than 80 percent of Americans engaged in farming. Most of the manufacturing centered on the first stages of the transformation of raw materials, with lumber and sawmills, textiles, and boots and shoes leading the way. The rich natural resources contributed to the rapid economic expansion of the nineteenth century. Ample land allowed the number of farmers to keep growing; but activity in manufacturing, services, transportation, and other sectors grew much faster, so that by 1860 the population was only about 50 percent rural, down from over 80 percent.

In the 19th century, recessions frequently coincided with financial crises. The Panic of 1837 was followed by a five-year depression, marked by bank failures and unprecedented unemployment. Because of the great changes in the economy over the centuries, it is difficult to compare the severity of modern recessions to that of early recessions. Recessions after World War II appear to have been less severe than earlier recessions, but the reasons for this are unclear.

=== 20th century ===
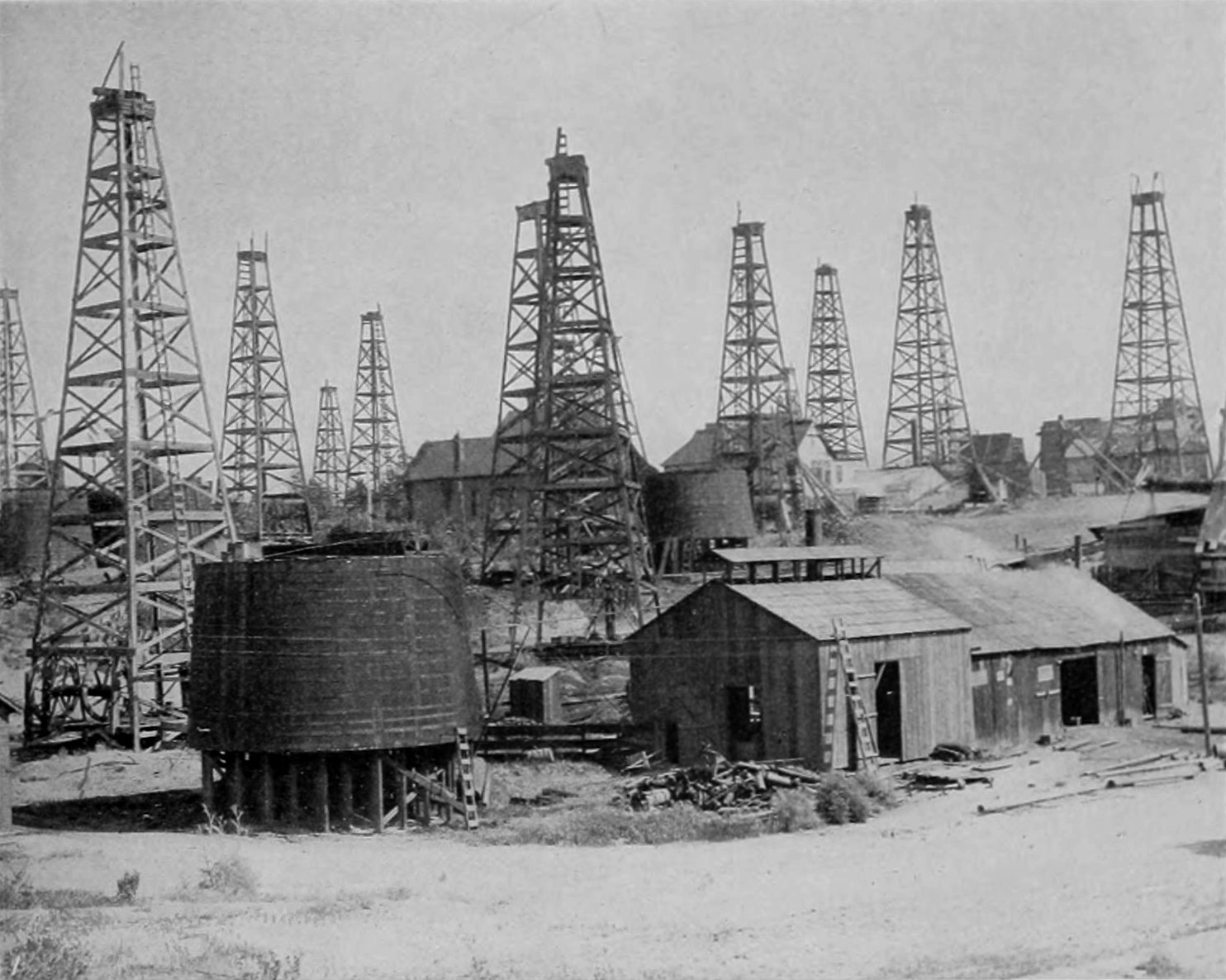
Oil wells in Los Angeles, 1905

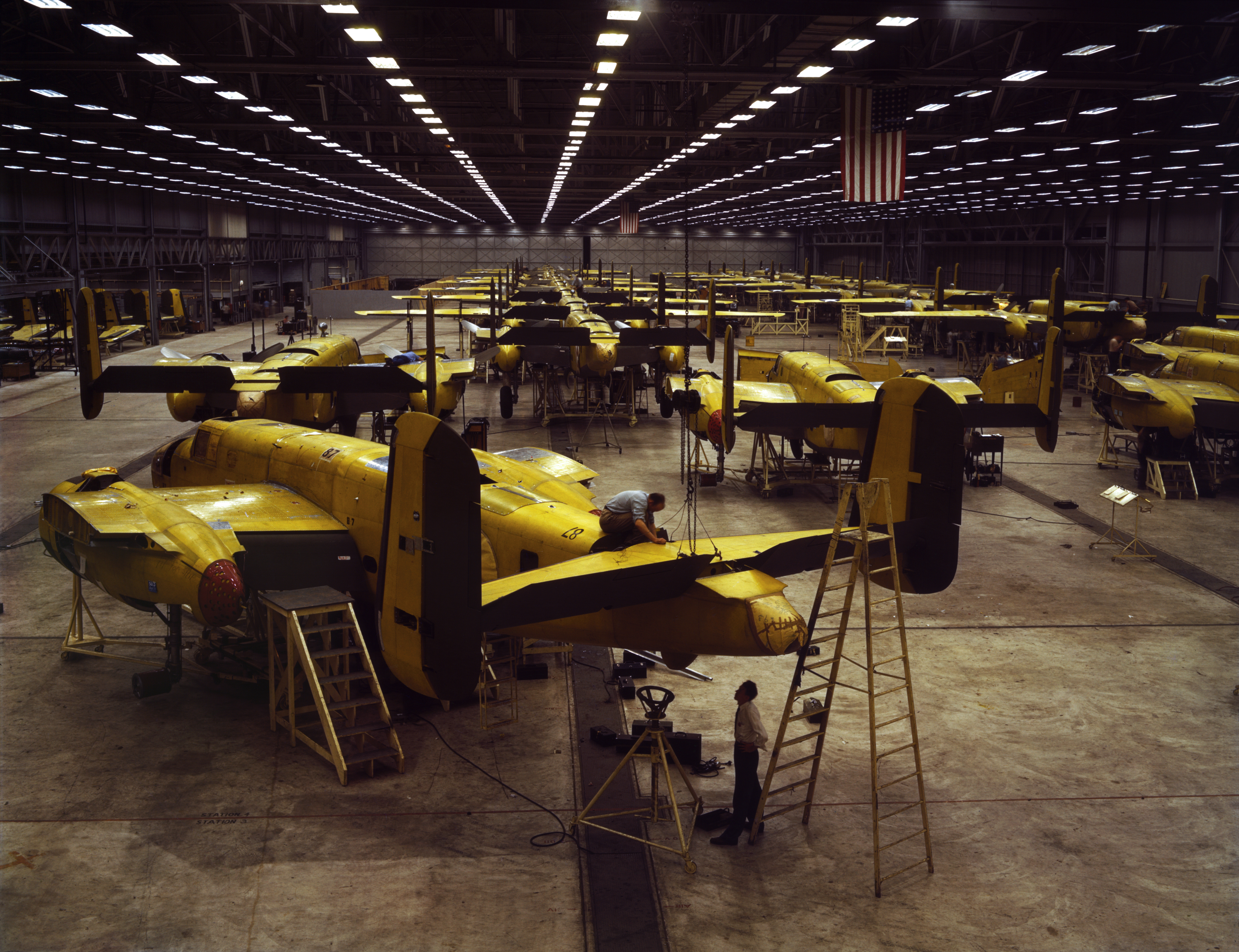
Assembling the North American B-25 Mitchell at Kansas City, 1942

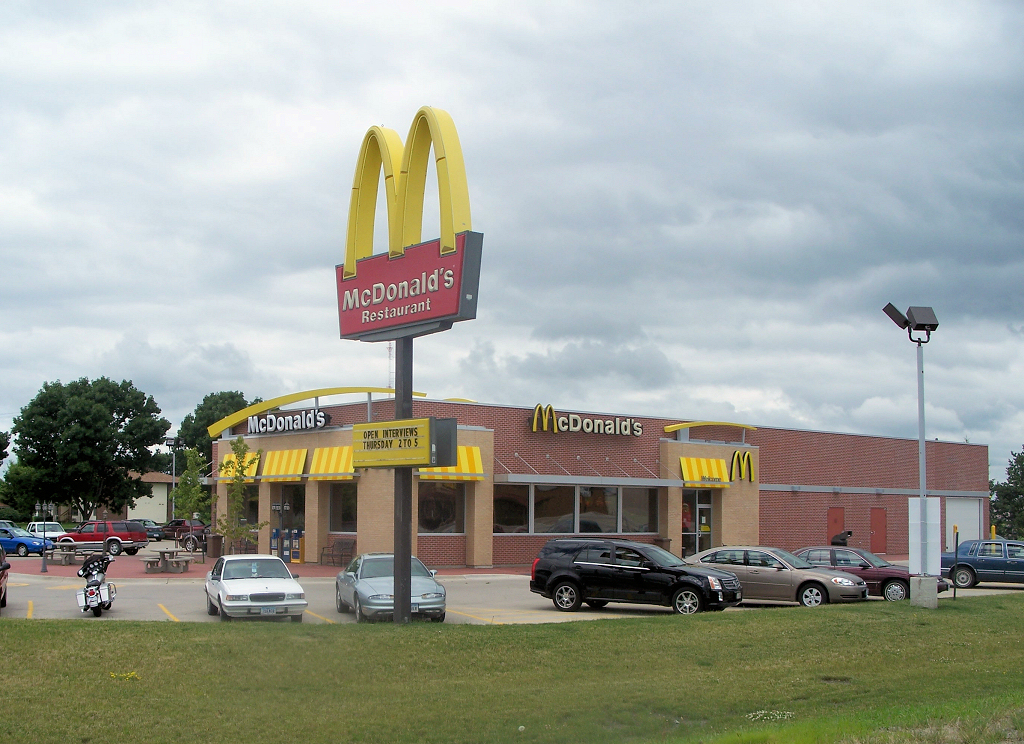
McDonald's restaurant in Mount Pleasant, Iowa, 2008

At the beginning of the century, new innovations and improvements in existing innovations opened the door for improvements in the standard of living among American consumers. Many firms grew large by taking advantage of economies of scale and better communication to run nationwide operations. Concentration in these industries raised fears of monopolies that would drive prices higher and output lower, but many of these firms were cutting costs so fast that trends were towards lower prices and more output in these industries. Many workers shared the success of these large firms, which typically offered the highest wages in the world.

The United States has been the world's largest national economy since around 1890, overtaking the United Kingdom in terms of GDP in 1872 and GDP per capita in 1905, adjusted for purchasing power parity (PPP). For many years following the Great Depression of the 1930s, when the danger of recession appeared most serious, the government strengthened the economy by spending heavily itself or cutting taxes so that consumers would spend more and by fostering rapid growth in the money supply, which also encouraged more spending. Ideas about the best tools for stabilizing the economy changed substantially between the 1930s and the 1980s. From the New Deal era that began in 1933 to the Great Society initiatives of the 1960s, national policymakers relied principally on fiscal policy to influence the economy.

During the world wars of the 20th century, the United States fared better than the rest of the combatants because none of World War I and relatively little of World War II were fought on American territory and neither war was fought in any of the 48 contiguous states. Yet, even in the United States, the wars meant sacrifice. During the peak of World War II activity, nearly 40 percent of U.S. GDP was devoted to war production. Decisions about large swaths of the economy were largely made for military purposes, and nearly all relevant inputs were allocated to the war effort. Many goods were rationed, prices and wages controlled, and many durable consumer goods were no longer produced. Large segments of the workforce were inducted into the military and paid half their wages; roughly half of those were sent into harm's way.

The approach, advanced by British economist John Maynard Keynes, gave elected officials a leading role in directing the economy since spending and taxes are controlled by the U.S. president and Congress. The "Baby Boom" saw a dramatic increase in fertility in the period 1942–1957; it was caused by delayed marriages and childbearing during the depression years, a surge in prosperity, a demand for suburban single-family homes (as opposed to inner city apartments), and new optimism about the future. The boom peaked around 1957 and then began to fade. A period of high inflation, interest rates, and unemployment after 1973 weakened confidence in fiscal policy as a tool for regulating the overall pace of economic activity.

The U.S. economy grew by an average of 3.8% from 1946 to 1973, while real median household income surged by 74% (or 2.1% a year).

Since the 1970s, several emerging countries have begun to close the economic gap with the United States. In most cases, this has been due to moving the manufacture of goods formerly made in the U.S. to countries where they could be made for sufficiently less money to cover the cost of shipping plus a higher profit. In other cases, some countries have gradually learned to produce the same products and services that previously only the U.S. and a few other countries could produce. Real income growth in the U.S. has slowed. In the 1970s and 1980s, it was popular in the U.S. to believe that Japan's economy would surpass that of the U.S., but this did not occur.

=== 21st century ===
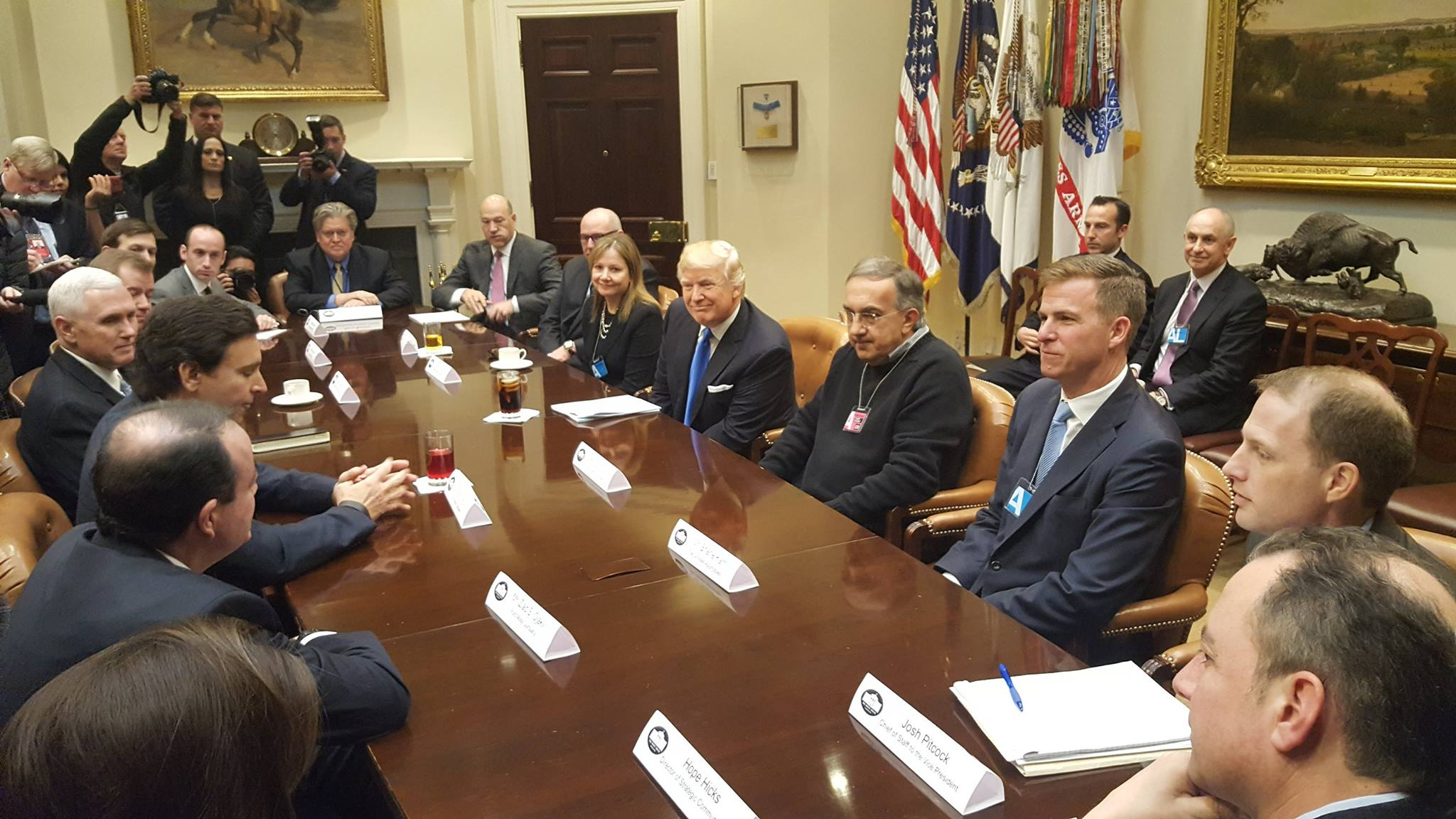
President Donald Trump with automobile industry leaders, 2017 (First Term)

The United States economy experienced a recession in 2001 with an unusually slow jobs recovery, with the number of jobs not regaining the February 2001 level until January 2005. This "jobless recovery" overlapped with the building of a housing bubble and arguably a wider debt bubble, as the ratio of household debt to GDP rose from a record level of 70% in Q1 2001 to 99% in Q1 2008. Homeowners were borrowing against their bubble-priced homes to fuel consumption, driving up their debt levels while providing an unsustainable boost to GDP. When housing prices began falling in 2006, the value of securities backed by mortgages fell dramatically, causing the equivalent of a bank run in the essentially unregulated non-depository banking system, which had outgrown the traditional, regulated depository banking system. Many mortgage companies and other non-depository banks (e.g., investment banks) faced a worsening crisis in 2007–2008, with the banking crisis peaking in September 2008, with the bankruptcy of Lehman Brothers and bailouts of several other financial institutions.

The Bush administration (2001–2009) and Obama administrations (2009–2017) applied banking bailout programs and Keynesian stimulus via high government deficits, while the Federal Reserve maintained near-zero interest rates. These measures helped the economy recover, as households paid down debts in 2009–2012, the only years since 1947 where this occurred, presenting a significant barrier to recovery. Real GDP regained its pre-crisis (late 2007) peak by 2011, household net worth by Q2 2012, non-farm payroll jobs by May 2014, and the unemployment rate by September 2015. Each of these variables continued into post-recession record territory following those dates, with the U.S. recovery becoming the second longest on record in April 2018.

The Great Recession occurred during the 2008 financial crisis, when GDP fell by 5.0% from the spring of 2008 to the spring of 2009. Other significant recessions took place in 1957–1958, when GDP fell 3.7% following the 1973 oil crisis, with a 3.1% fall from late 1973 to early 1975, and in the 1981–1982 recession, when GDP dropped by 2.9%. Recent, mild recessions have included the 1990–1991 downturn, when output fell by 1.3%, and the 2001 recession, in which GDP slid by 0.3%; the 2001 downturn lasted just eight months. The most vigorous, sustained periods of growth, on the other hand, took place from early 1961 to mid-1969, with an expansion of 53% (5.1% a year), from mid-1991 to late 2000, at 43% (3.8% a year), and from late 1982 to mid-1990, at 37% (4% a year).

Debt held by the public, a measure of national debt, has risen throughout the 21st century. Rising from 31% in 2000 to 52% in 2009, reaching 77% of GDP in 2017, and exceeding 120% in 2024, the U.S. ranked 43rd highest in debt out of 207 countries.

==== COVID-19 pandemic ====
In the first two quarters of 2020 amid Donald Trump's presidency, the U.S. economy suffered major setbacks beginning in March 2020, due to the novel coronavirus and having to "shut-down" major sectors of the American economy. As of March 2020, US exports of automobiles and industrial machines had plummeted as a result of the worldwide pandemic. Social distancing measures which took effect in March 2020, and which negatively impacted the demand for goods and services, resulted in the US GDP declining at a 4.8% annualized rate in the first quarter, the steepest pace of contraction in output since the fourth quarter of 2008. US retails sales dropped a record 8.7% in March alone. The US airline industry had also been hit hard, seeing a sharp decline in its revenues. The COVID-19 recession has been widely described as the most severe global economic downturn since the Great Depression and "far worse" than the Great Recession.

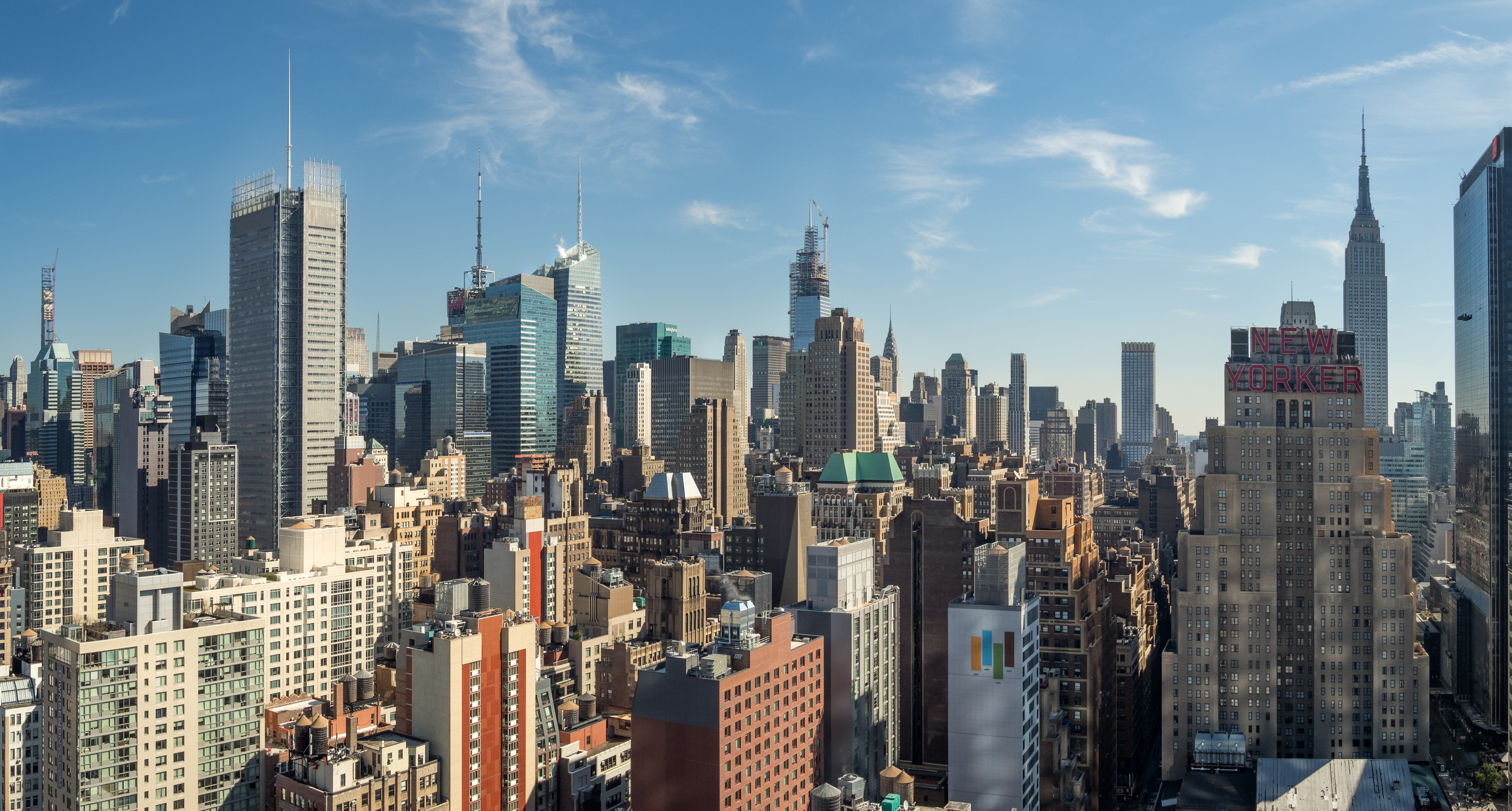
Midtown Manhattan, the world's largest central business district

In May 2020, CNN gave an analysis based on unemployment data that the US economy was perhaps the worst that it had been since the 1930s. By May 8, the US had reached a record 14.7 percent unemployment, with 20.5 million jobs lost in April. The Chairman of the US Federal Reserve, Jerome Powell, warned that it may take "an extended time" before the US economy fully recovers from weak economic growth, due to the pandemic, and that in the foreseeable future the US can expect "low productivity growth and stagnant incomes". By May 31, 2020, more than forty million Americans had filed for unemployment benefits.

By June 2020, the slump in US continental flights due to the coronavirus pandemic had resulted in the US government temporarily halting service of fifteen US airlines to 75 domestic airports. The New York Times reported on June 10, 2020, that "the United States budget deficit grew to a record $1.88 trillion for the first eight months of this fiscal year."

The US economy recovered from the COVID-19 pandemic in 2021, growing by 5.7%, which was its best performance since Ronald Reagan's presidency (1981–1989).

2021–2022 marked a historical inflation surge in the United States, with the Consumer Price Index inflation rate hitting 9.1% higher in June 2022 than June 2021, constituting a 41-year high inflation rate with critics blaming the Federal Reserve among other factors. Inflation rate reached 4.9% in April 2023, which was roughly 3% above the Federal Reserve's 2% target rate.

According to a 2024 report put out by Brookings Institution, the American economy fared better following the impacts of the COVID-19 pandemic as compared to the Great Recession, also outpacing the recovery of other countries in the G10. In contrast, both Republican and Democratic leaders provided unprecedented fiscal support through relief bills in 2020 and 2021 to preserve economic activity. Researchers found the preservation of payroll and direct support to households mitigated much of the long-term impact felt following the 2008 crisis, and the supply chain disruptions were more to blame for the inflation that occurred.

==== Post-COVID economy ====
On a global scale, the US recovered from COVID's economic drawbacks better than other countries. This includes outpacing the recovery of other economic groups like the G10 and Eurozone, with private consumption rising at a higher pace. By September 2025, inflation had fallen to 2.9%.

The post-COVID US economy has been described as a "K-shaped" economy, or an economy in which wealthy income earners are benefiting from the stock market and rising property values, while lower income earners are having more difficulty making ends meet.

The pandemic has been determined as a major contributor to the increased cost of housing in the United States, according to a study published in the National Library of Medicine. Prior to the pandemic, home ownership rates were already falling due to continued challenges caused by the 2008 recession. The pandemic exacerbated the crisis due to layoffs, rent moratoriums, and increasing foreclosures as the result in lost income. People chose to leave highly populated areas for more rural communities. More people began working from home, allowing for more flexibility in where they lived. The interest rate fell on 30-year mortgages, further increasing the demand for homes. The result was rapidly increasing housing costs. The most impacted have been minorities and people with disabilities.

According to a report released July 13, 2026 by the Federal Reserve Bank of Cleveland, the earnings gap between Black and Hispanic men and White men narrowed following the COVID-19 recession to its lowest point in 25 years in 2022. Black and Hispanic men also experienced a stronger employment recovery than that of White men for the same time period. The shift coincided with, but is not fully attributed to, a slight increase in the number of Black and Hispanic males that obtained both a high school diploma and Bachelors degree.

In 2025, Indeed research stated new job listings had fallen below pre-pandemic levels. Challenger, Gray & Christmas, a global outplacement firm, stated planned layoffs totaled over 1.1 million that November, which was 54% more than in 2024 for the same time period. By mid 2026, 26% of unemployed people had been jobless for longer than six months. Many turned to starting their own business rather than seeking traditional employment. Consumer sentiment had reached a low comparable to that of 2022, according to The University of Michigan’s consumer sentiment survey. Another survey by KeyBank stated that 35% of 1,000 Americans surveyed were seeking some sort of secondary income through self employment. According to business formation reports from Registered Agents Inc, the number of formations has increased since the initial recovery of the pandemic. The number of businesses formed reached a record monthly high in March 2026, with 624,915 business formations nationwide. The New York Times and Inc. reported that part of the increase in business formations is likely due to the availability of artificial intelligence and its role in simplifying the process of getting started, either by providing answers to questions, or completing tasks that previously required the hiring of employees.

==== 2026 Iran war ====
In April 2026, the U.S. Bureau of Labor Statistics reported a 0.9% increase in the Consumer Price Index (CPI) for March 2026, based on the latest data; however, a government shutdown in late 2025 had disrupted the data collection and analysis process. The price index for heating oil rose by 44.2% compared to the previous year, while energy costs increased by 12.5%. Food costs also rose by 2.7% through March 2026. Trading Economics has forecast an inflation rate of approximately 3.5% for the remainder of 2026.

In late September 2026, Federal Reserve Board member Michael Barr stated, "The combination of tariffs and a prolonged war with Iran has caused us to 'deviate from our original path toward the 2% inflation target.'" Consumer spending is expected to rise 0.8% in August, partly due to higher gas prices. In July, it only rose 0.2%. Bank of America noted strong spending despite increased energy costs. Debt and credit card spending grew 6.9% year-over-year, largely from a 26.5% rise in gasoline, while spending excluding gas increased 5.7%. According to the Joint Economic Committee, energy price inflation rose to 16.28 percent from August 2025 to August 2026.

== Data ==
The following table shows the main economic indicators in 1980–2025 (with IMF staff estimates in 2026–2031). Inflation below 5% is in green.

Year	GDP (in bn. US$PPP)	GDP per capita (in US$ PPP)	GDP (in bn. US$nominal)	GDP per capita (in US$ nominal)	GDP growth (real)	Inflation rate (in percent)	Unemployment (in %)	Government debt (in % of GDP)
1980	2,857.3	12,552.9	2,857.3	12,552.9	▼-0.3%	▲13.5%	7.2%	n/a
1981	▲3,207.0	▲13,948.7	▲3,207.0	▲13,948.7	▲2.5%	▲10.4%	▲7.6%	n/a
1982	▲3,343.8	▲14,405.0	▲3,343.8	▲14,405.0	▼-1.8%	▲6.2%	▲9.7%	n/a
1983	▲3,634.0	▲15,513.7	▲3,634.0	▲15,513.7	▲4.6%	▲3.2%	▼9.6%	n/a
1984	▲4,037.7	▲17,086.4	▲4,037.7	▲17,086.4	▲7.2%	▲4.4%	▼7.5%	n/a
1985	▲4,339.0	▲18,199.3	▲4,339.0	▲18,199.3	▲4.2%	▲3.5%	▼7.2%	n/a
1986	▲4,579.6	▲19,034.8	▲4,579.6	▲19,034.8	▲3.5%	▲1.9%	▼7.0%	n/a
1987	▲4,855.3	▲20,001.0	▲4,855.3	▲20,001.0	▲3.5%	▲3.6%	▼6.2%	n/a
1988	▲5,236.4	▲21,376.0	▲5,236.4	▲21,376.0	▲4.2%	▲4.1%	▼5.5%	n/a
1989	▲5,641.6	▲22,814.1	▲5,641.6	▲22,814.1	▲3.7%	▲4.8%	▼5.3%	n/a
1990	▲5,963.1	▲23,848.0	▲5,963.1	▲23,848.0	▲1.9%	▲5.4%	▲5.6%	n/a
1991	▲6,158.1	▲24,302.8	▲6,158.1	▲24,302.8	▼-0.1%	▲4.2%	▲6.9%	n/a
1992	▲6,520.3	▲25,392.9	▲6,520.3	▲25,392.9	▲3.5%	▲3.0%	▲7.5%	n/a
1993	▲6,858.6	▲26,364.2	▲6,858.6	▲26,364.2	▲2.8%	▲3.0%	▼6.9%	n/a
1994	▲7,287.3	▲27,674.0	▲7,287.3	▲27,674.0	▲4.0%	▲2.6%	▼6.1%	n/a
1995	▲7,639.8	▲28,671.5	▲7,639.8	▲28,671.5	▲2.7%	▲2.8%	▼5.6%	n/a
1996	▲8,073.1	▲29,947.0	▲8,073.1	▲29,947.0	▲3.8%	▲2.9%	▼5.4%	n/a
1997	▲8,577.6	▲31,440.1	▲8,577.6	▲31,440.1	▲4.4%	▲2.3%	▼4.9%	n/a
1998	▲9,062.8	▲32,833.7	▲9,062.8	▲32,833.7	▲4.5%	▲1.5%	▼4.5%	n/a
1999	▲9,631.2	▲34,496.2	▲9,631.2	▲34,496.2	▲4.8%	▲2.2%	▼4.2%	n/a
2000	▲10,251.0	▲36,312.8	▲10,251.0	▲36,312.8	▲4.1%	▲3.4%	▼4.0%	n/a
2001	▲10,581.9	▲37,101.5	▲10,581.9	▲37,101.5	▲1.0%	▲2.8%	▲4.7%	53.5%
2002	▲10,929.1	▲37,945.8	▲10,929.1	▲37,945.8	▲1.7%	▲1.6%	▲5.8%	▲55.9%
2003	▲11,456.5	▲39,405.4	▲11,456.5	▲39,405.4	▲2.8%	▲2.3%	▲6.0%	▲59.0%
2004	▲12,217.2	▲41,641.6	▲12,217.2	▲41,641.6	▲3.8%	▲2.7%	▼5.5%	▲66.4%
2005	▲13,039.2	▲44,034.3	▲13,039.2	▲44,034.3	▲3.5%	▲3.4%	▼5.1%	▼65.8%
2006	▲13,815.6	▲46,216.9	▲13,815.6	▲46,216.9	▲2.8%	▲3.2%	▼4.6%	▼64.5%
2007	▲14,474.3	▲47,943.4	▲14,474.3	▲47,943.4	▲2.0%	▲2.9%	4.6%	▲65.0%
2008	▲14,769.9	▲48,470.6	▲14,769.9	▲48,470.6	▲0.1%	▲3.8%	▲5.8%	▲73.9%
2009	▼14,478.1	▼47,102.4	▼14,478.1	▼47,102.4	▼-2.6%	▼-0.3%	▲9.3%	▲87.1%
2010	▲15,049.0	▲48,586.3	▲15,049.0	▲48,586.3	▲2.7%	▲1.6%	▲9.6%	▲95.7%
2011	▲15,599.7	▲50,008.1	▲15,599.7	▲50,008.1	▲1.6%	▲3.1%	▼8.9%	▲100.0%
2012	▲16,254.0	▲51,736.7	▲16,254.0	▲51,736.7	▲2.3%	▲2.1%	▼8.1%	▲103.7%
2013	▲16,880.7	▲53,363.9	▲16,880.7	▲53,363.9	▲2.1%	▲1.5%	▼7.4%	▲105.0%
2014	▲17,608.1	▲55,263.8	▲17,608.1	▲55,263.8	▲2.5%	▲1.6%	▼6.2%	105.0%
2015	▲18,295.0	▲57,006.9	▲18,295.0	▲57,006.9	▲2.9%	▲0.1%	▼5.3%	▲105.5%
2016	▲18,804.9	▲58,179.7	▲18,804.9	▲58,179.7	▲1.8%	▲1.3%	▼4.9%	▲107.5%
2017	▲19,612.1	▲60,293.0	▲19,612.1	▲60,293.0	▲2.5%	▲2.1%	▼4.4%	▼106.5%
2018	▲20,656.5	▲63,165.3	▲20,656.5	▲63,165.3	▲3.0%	▲2.4%	▼3.9%	▲107.7%
2019	▲21,540.0	▲65,561.3	▲21,540.0	▲65,561.3	▲2.6%	▲1.8%	▼3.7%	▲108.8%
2020	▼21,375.3	▼64,518.0	▼21,375.3	▼64,518.0	▼-2.1%	▲1.3%	▲8.1%	▲132.6%
2021	▲23,745.9	▲71,426.5	▲23,745.9	▲71,426.5	▲6.3%	▲4.7%	▼5.4%	▼125.0%
2022	▲26,059.7	▲77,964.3	▲26,059.7	▲77,964.3	▲2.4%	▲8.0%	▼3.7%	▼119.2%
2023	▲27,825.9	▲82,578.8	▲27,825.9	▲82,578.8	▲2.9%	▲4.1%	▼3.6%	▲120.0%
2024	▲29,381.0	▲86,417.5	▲29,381.0	▲86,417.5	▲3.0%	▲3.0%	▲4.0%	▲122.3%
2025	▲30,861.3	▲90,266.8	▲30,861.3	▲90,266.8	▲2.3%	▲2.7%	▲4.3%	▲124.4%
2026	▲32,642.4	▲95,212.1	▲32,642.4	▲95,212.1	▲2.3%	▲3.6%	▼4.2%	▲126.8%
2027	▲34,441.6	▲100,207.5	▲34,441.6	▲100,207.5	▲2.3%	▲2.8%	▼4.0%	▲128.7%
2028	▲35,877.1	▲104,104.1	▲35,877.1	▲104,104.1	▲2.1%	▲2.1%	4.0%	▲132.3%
2029	▲37,246.0	▲107,769.6	▲37,246.0	▲107,769.6	▲1.9%	▲1.9%	▼3.9%	▲136.4%
2030	▲38,604.6	▲111,370.8	▲38,604.6	▲111,370.8	▲1.8%	▲1.9%	3.9%	▲140.7%
2031	▲39,960.7	▲114,954.6	▲39,960.7	▲114,954.6	▲1.8%	▲1.9%	3.9%	▲145.0%

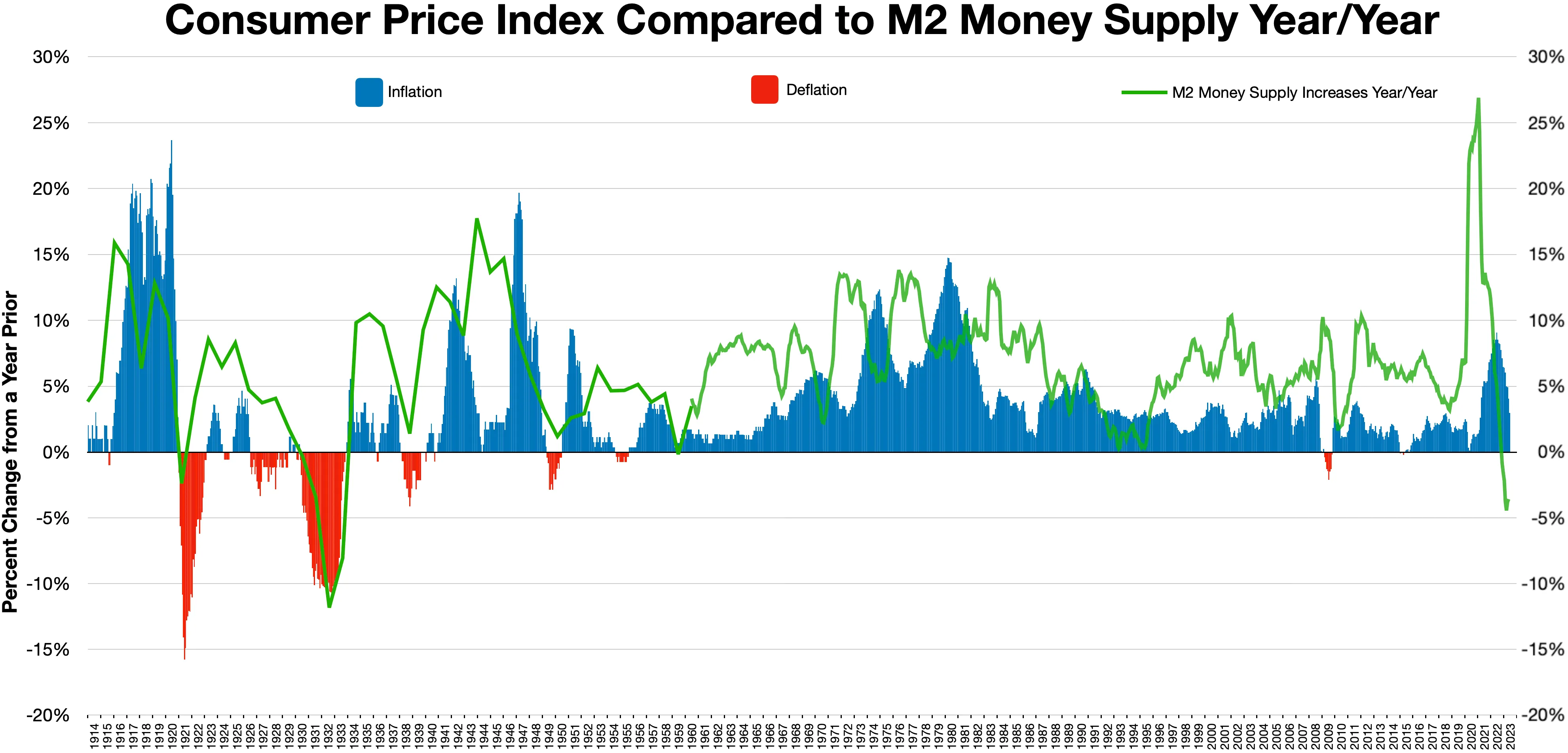
Inflation Deflation M2 money supply increases Year/Year

== GDP ==
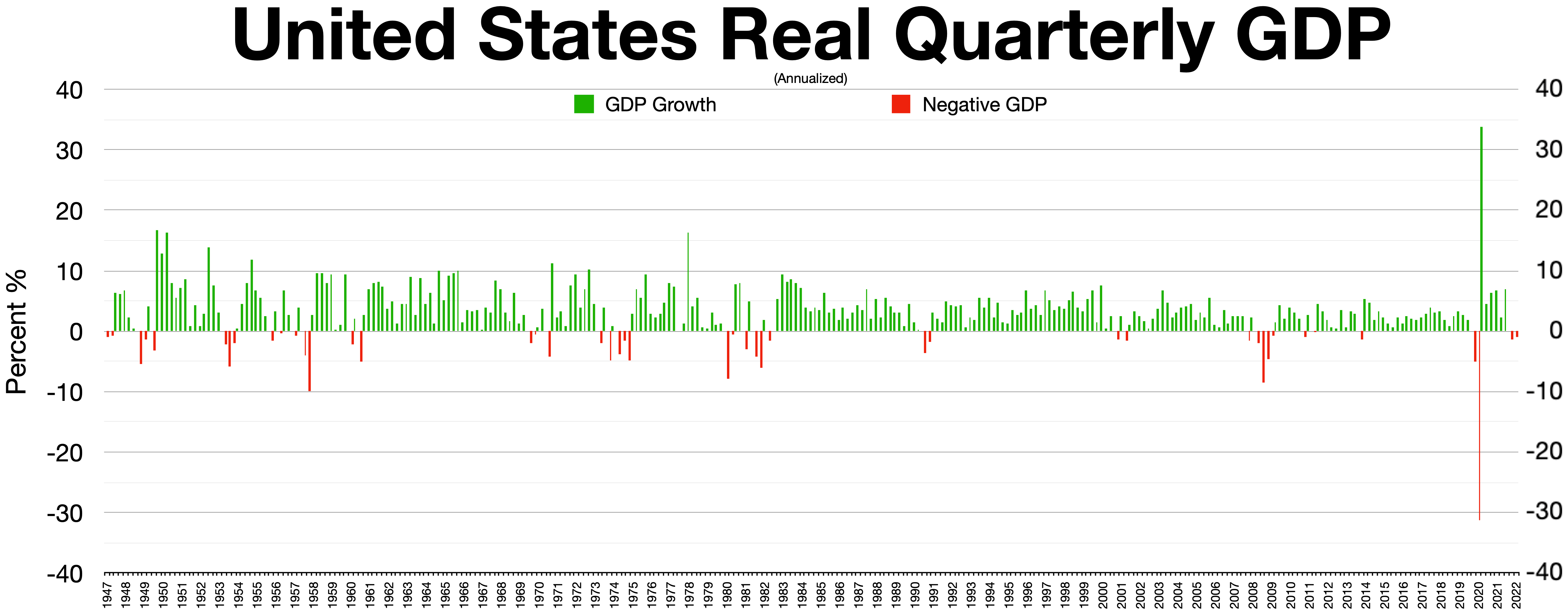
United States real quarterly GDP (annualized)

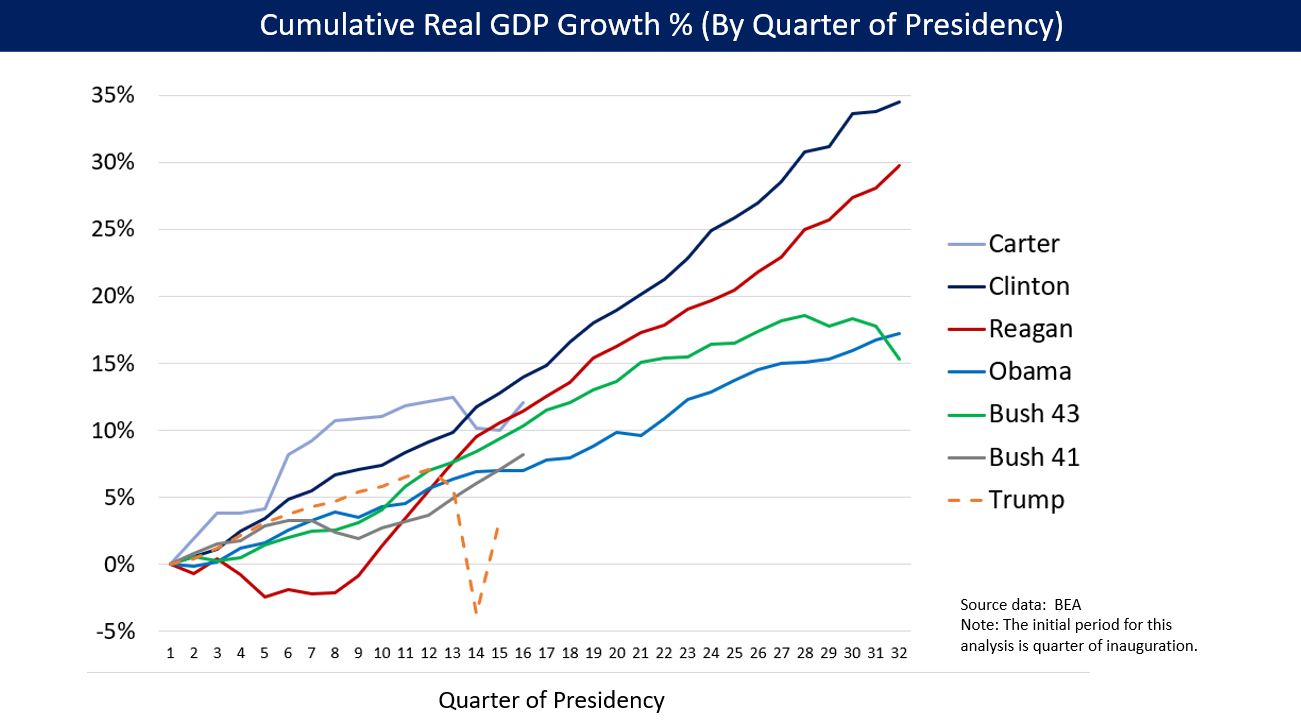
U.S. cumulative real (inflation-adjusted) GDP growth by US president (from Reagan to Obama)

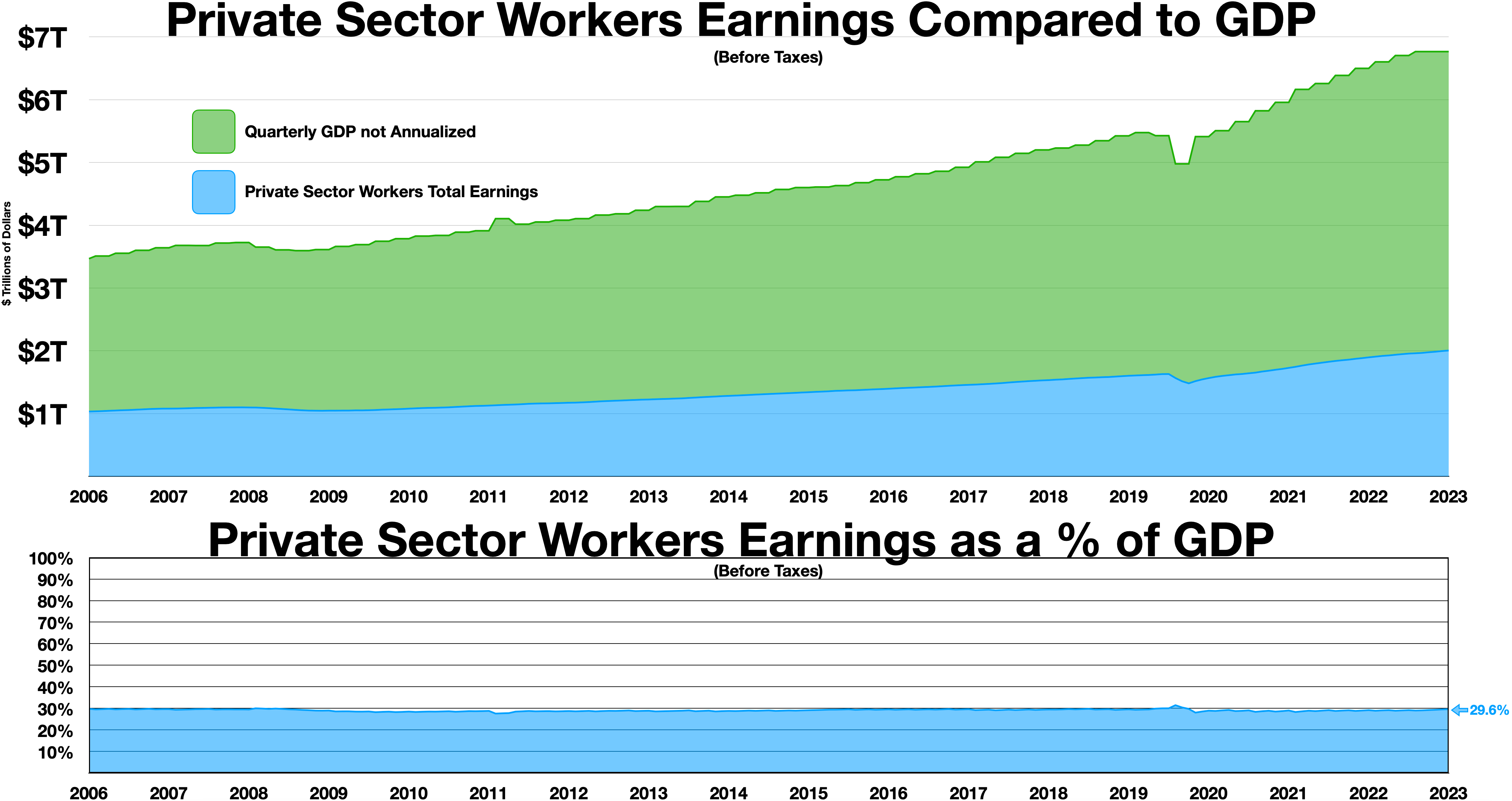
Private sector workers earnings compared to GDP Private sector workers made ~$2 trillion or about 29.6% of all money earned in Q3 2023 (before taxes) Quarterly GDP not Annualized Private Sector Workers Total Earnings

U.S. nominal GDP was estimated at $31.856 trillion in the first quarter of 2026, the largest in the world. Annualized, nominal GDP reached $20.1 trillion in Q1 2018, the first time it exceeded $20 trillion. About 70% of U.S. GDP is personal consumption, with business investment 18%, government 17% (federal, state and local but excluding transfer payments such as Social Security, which is in consumption), and net exports a negative 3% due to the U.S. trade deficit.

Real gross domestic product increased at an annualized rate of 1.5% in the second quarter of 2026, following an annualized increase of 2.1% in the first quarter.

Real gross domestic product, a measure of both production and income, grew by 2.3% in 2017, vs. 1.5% in 2016 and 2.9% in 2015. Real GDP grew at a quarterly annualized rate of 2.2% in Q1 2018, 4.2% in Q2 2018, 3.4% in Q3 2018, and 2.2% in Q4 2018; the Q2 rate was the best growth rate since Q3 2014, and the overall yearly GDP growth of 2.9% in 2018 was the best performance of the economy in a decade. In 2020, the growth rate of the GDP started to drop as a result of the COVID-19 pandemic, resulting in the GDP decreasing at an annual rate of −5.0% in Q1 2020 and −32.9% in Q2 2020, respectively.

As of 2014, China passed the U.S. as the largest economy in GDP (PPP) terms, measured at purchasing power parity conversion rates. The U.S. had the highest GDP (PPP) figures for more than a century prior to that milestone; China has more than tripled the U.S. growth rate for each of the past 40 years. As of 2017, the European Union as an aggregate had a GDP roughly 5% larger than the U.S., although the former is a political union, not a country. The United States', however, remained the world's largest economy with the highest nominal GDP.

Real GDP per capita (measured in 2009 dollars) was $52,444 in 2017 and has been growing each year since 2010. It grew 3.0% per year on average in the 1960s, 2.1% in the 1970s, 2.4% in the 1980s, 2.2% in the 1990s, 0.7% in the 2000s, and 0.9% from 2010 to 2017. Reasons for slower growth since 2000 are debated by economists and may include aging demographics, slower population and growth in labor force, slower productivity growth, reduced corporate investment, greater income inequality reducing demand, lack of major innovations, and reduced labor power. The U.S. ranked 20th out of 220 countries in GDP per capita in 2017. Among the modern U.S. Presidents, Bill Clinton had the highest cumulative percent real GDP increase during his two terms, Ronald Reagan second, and Barack Obama third.

The development of the nation's GDP according to World Bank: U.S. real GDP grew by an average of 1.7% from 2000 to the first half of 2014, a rate around half the historical average up to 2000.

Panorama of Midtown Manhattan

== By economic sector ==
=== Nominal GDP sector composition ===
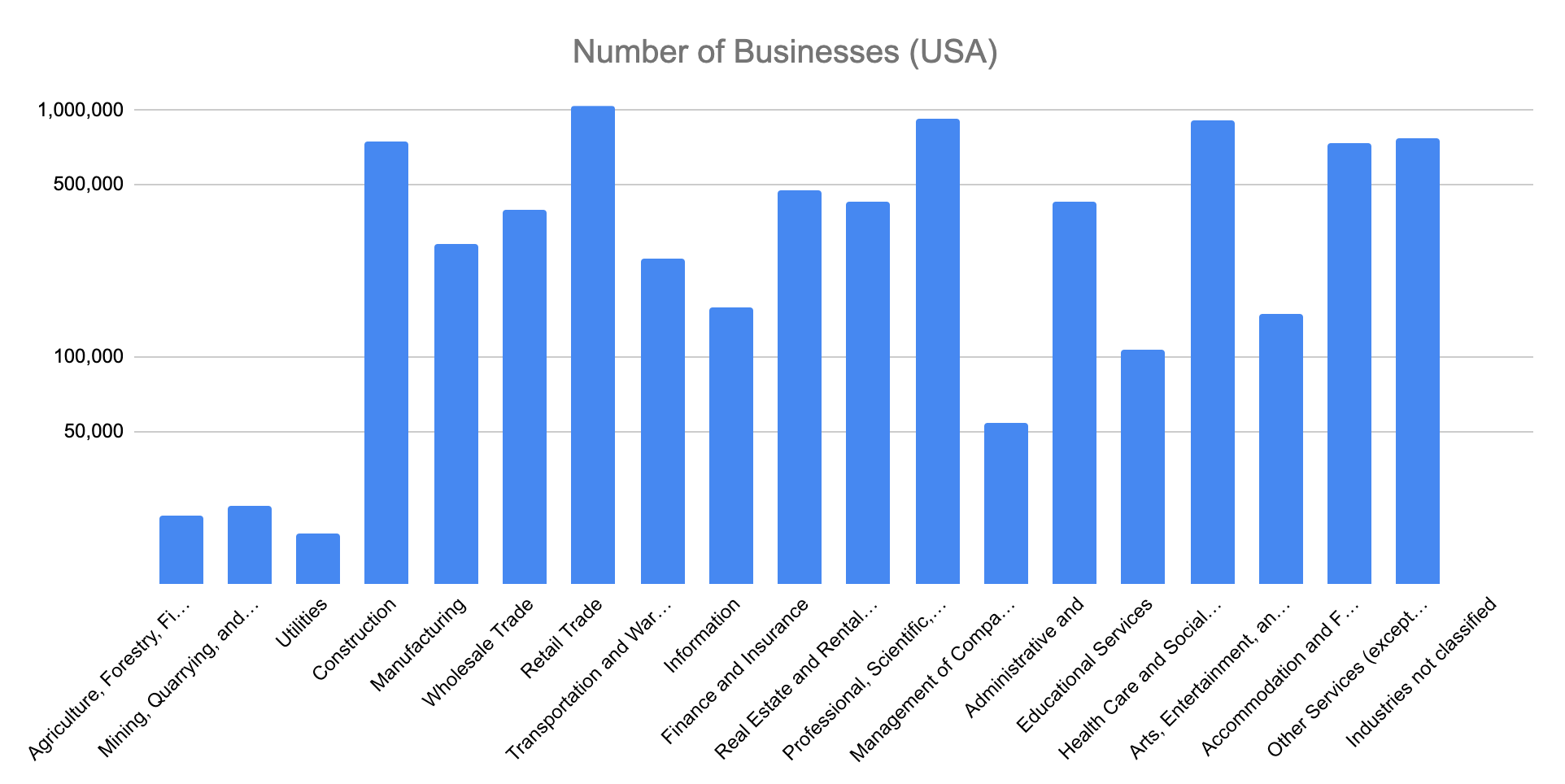
Number of businesses by type (US Census Bureau, 2019)

Nominal GDP sector composition, 2015 (in millions of dollars) at 2005 constant prices

Country/Economy	Real GDP	Agri.	Indus.	Serv.
World	60,093,221	1,968,215	16,453,140	38,396,695
United States	15,160,104	149,023	3,042,332	11,518,980

Nominal GDP Sector Composition, 2016 (in millions of dollars) at current prices.

Country/Economy	Nominal GDP	Agri.	Indus.	Serv.
United States	18,624,450	204,868.95	3,613,143.3	14,806,437.75
*Percentages from CIA World Factbook

== Employment ==
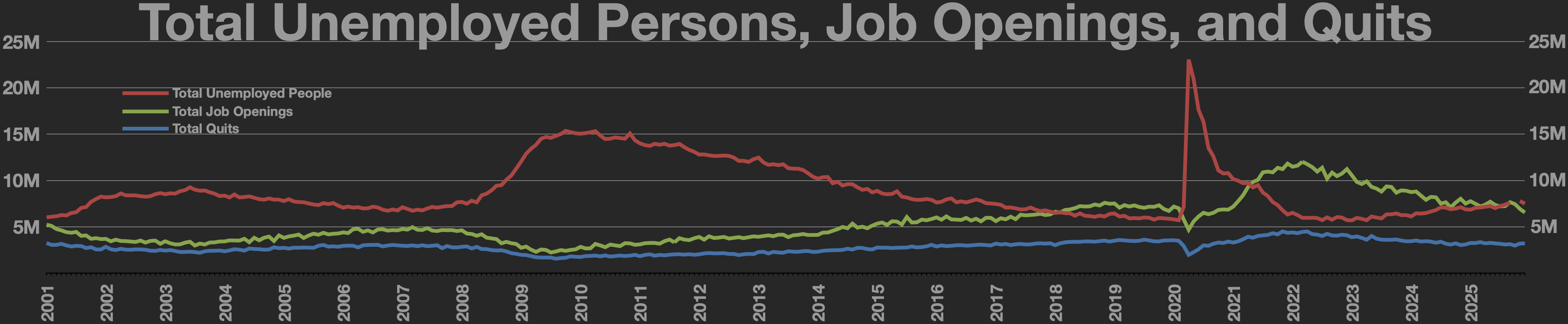
JOLTS report Total unemployed people Total job openings Total quits

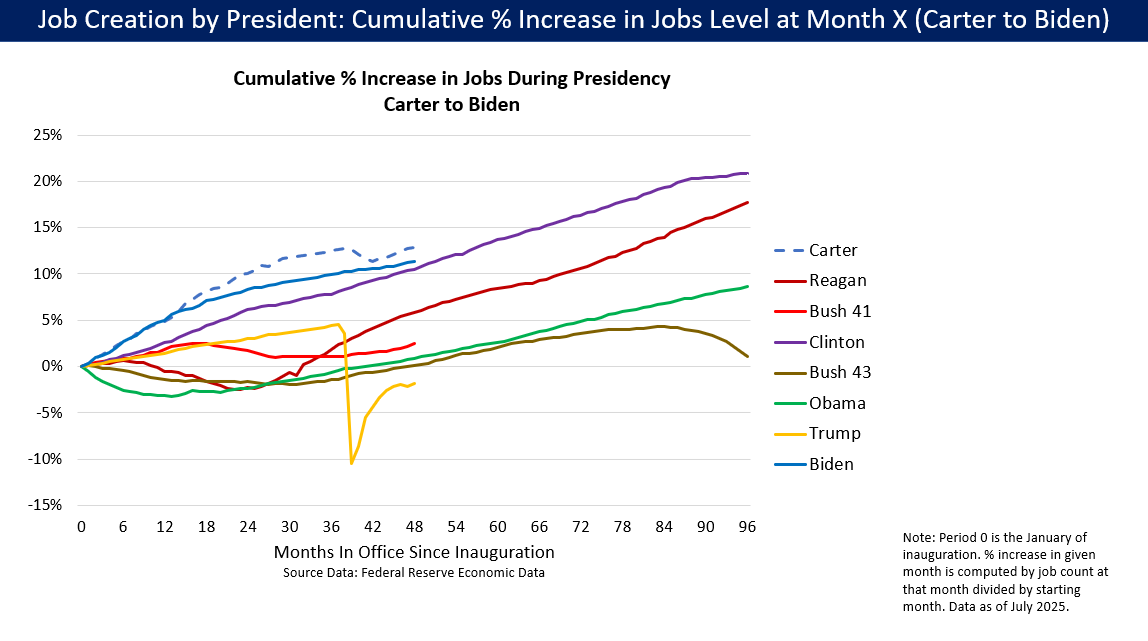
Job growth by US president, measured as cumulative percentage change from month after inauguration to end of term

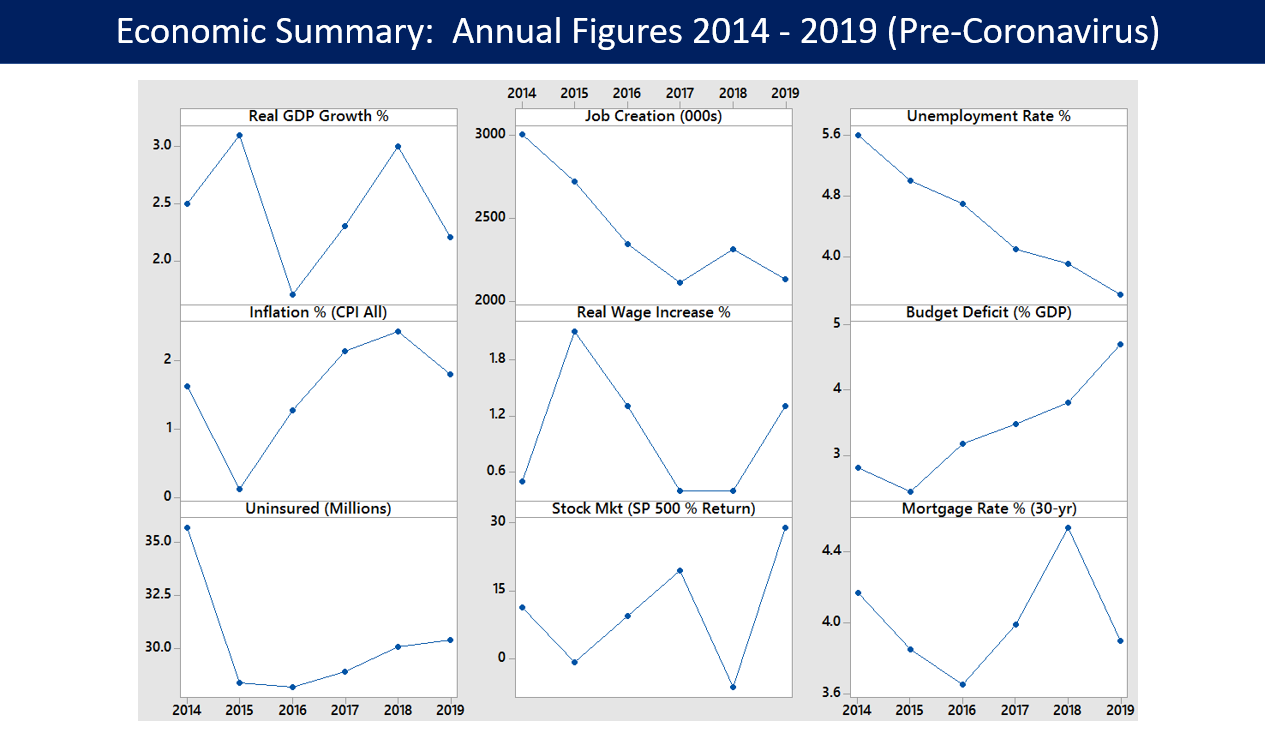
Panel chart illustrates nine key economic variables measured annually in 2014–2017. The years 2014–2016 were during President Obama's second term, while 2017 was during President Trump's term. Refer to citations on detail page.

There were approximately 160.4 million people in the U.S. labor force in 2017, the fourth largest labor force in the world behind China, India, and the European Union. The government (federal, state and local) employed 22 million in 2010. Small businesses are the nation's largest employer, representing 37% of American workers. The second-largest share of employment belongs to large businesses employing 36% of the U.S. workforce. White collar workers comprise 44% of the workforce as of 2022, up from 34% in 2000.

The nation's private sector employs 85% of working Americans. Government accounts for 14% of all U.S. workers. Over 99% of all private employing organizations in the U.S. are small businesses. The 30 million small businesses in the U.S. account for 64% of newly created jobs (those created minus those lost). Jobs in small businesses accounted for 70% of those created in the last decade.

The proportion of Americans employed by small business versus large business has remained relatively the same year by year as some small businesses become large businesses and just over half of small businesses survive for more than five years. Among large businesses, several of the largest companies and employers in the world are American companies. Among them is Walmart, which is both the largest company and the largest private sector employer in the world. Walmart employs 2.1 million people worldwide and 1.4 million in the U.S. alone.

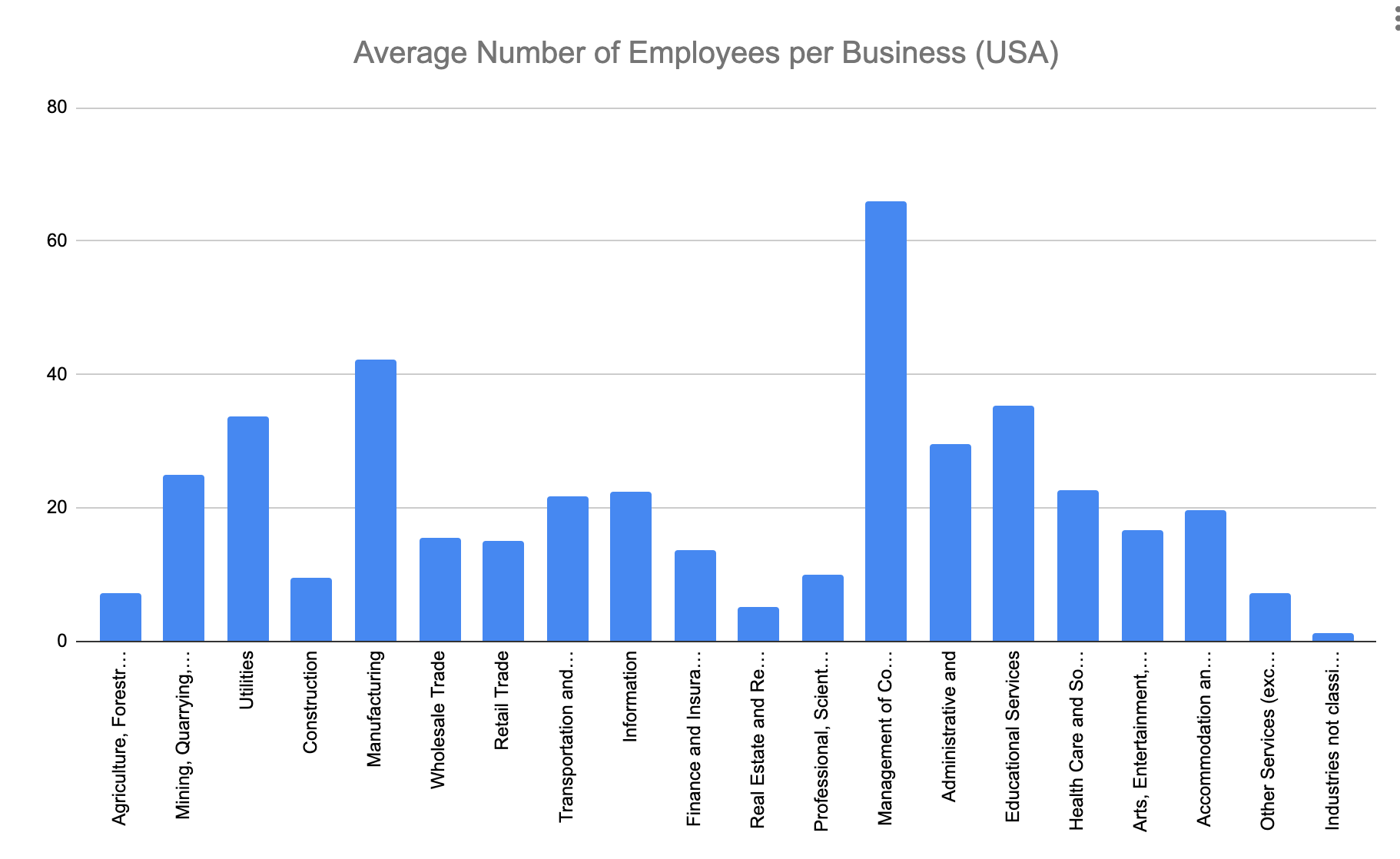
US Census Bureau (number of employees per business)

Since the 1970s there has been a decoupling of U.S. wage gains from worker productivity.

There are nearly thirty million small businesses in the U.S.. Minorities such as Hispanics, African Americans, Asian Americans, and Native Americans (35% of the country's population), own 4.1 million of the nation's businesses. Minority-owned businesses generate almost $700 billion in revenue, and they employ almost five million workers in the U.S.

Americans have the highest average employee income among OECD nations. The median household income in the U.S. as of 2008 is $52,029. About 284,000 working people in the U.S. have two full-time jobs and 7.6 million have part-time ones in addition to their full-time employments. Out of all working individuals in the U.S., 12% belong to a labor union and most union members work for the government. The decline of union membership in the U.S. over the last several decades parallels that of labor's share of the economy. The World Bank ranks the United States first in the ease of hiring and firing workers.

The United States is the only advanced economy that does not legally guarantee its workers paid vacation or paid sick days, and is one of just a few countries in the world without paid family leave as a legal right, with the others being Papua New Guinea, Suriname and Liberia. In 2014 and again in 2020, the International Trade Union Confederation graded the U.S. a 4 out of 5+, its third-lowest score, on the subject of workers' rights. Similarly, a 2023 study published by Oxfam found that the United States ranks among the worst among developed countries for labor protections. Some scholars, including business theorist Jeffrey Pfeffer and political scientist Daniel Kinderman, posit that contemporary employment practices in the United States relating to the increased performance pressure from management, and the hardships imposed on employees such as toxic working environments, precarity, and long hours, could be responsible for 120,000 excess deaths annually, making the workplace the fifth leading cause of death in the United States.

=== Unemployment ===
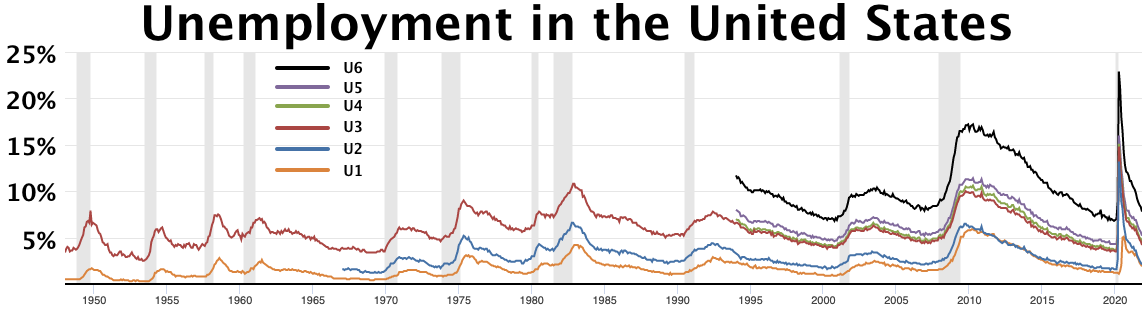
U1-U6 unemployment rate

As of December 2017, the unemployment rate in the U.S. was 4.1% or 6.6 million people. The government's broader U-6 unemployment rate, which includes the part-time underemployed, was 8.1% or 8.2 million people. These figures were calculated with a civilian labor force of approximately 160.6 million people, relative to a U.S. population of approximately 327 million people.

Between 2009 and 2010, following the Great Recession, the emerging problem of jobless recoveries resulted in record levels of long-term unemployment with more than six million workers looking for work for more than six months as of January 2010. This particularly affected older workers. A year after the recession ended in June 2009, immigrants gained 656,000 jobs in the U.S., while U.S.-born workers lost more than a million jobs, due in part to an aging country (relatively more white retirees) and demographic shifts. In April 2010, the official unemployment rate was 9.9%, but the government's broader U-6 unemployment rate was 17.1%. Between February 2008 and February 2010, the number of people working part-time for economic reasons (i.e., would prefer to work full-time) increased by 4.0 million to 8.8 million, an 83% increase in part-time workers during the two-year period.

By 2013, although the unemployment rate had fallen below 8%, the record proportion of long term unemployed and continued decreasing household income remained indicative of a jobless recovery. However, the number of payroll jobs returned to its pre-recession (November 2007) level by May 2014 as the economy recovered.

After being higher in the post-war period, the U.S. unemployment rate fell below the rising eurozone unemployment rate in the mid-1980s and has remained significantly lower almost continuously since. In 1955, 55% of Americans worked in services, between 30% and 35% in industry, and between 10% and 15% in agriculture. By 1980, over 65% were employed in services, between 25% and 30% in industry, and less than 5% in agriculture. Male unemployment continued to be significantly higher than those of females (at 9.8% vs. 7.5% in 2009). The unemployment among Caucasians continues being much lower than those for African-Americans (at 8.5% vs. 15.8% also in 2009).

The youth unemployment rate was 18.5% in July 2009, the highest rate in that month since 1948. The unemployment rate of young African Americans was 28.2% in May 2013.

The unemployment rate reached an all-time high of 14.7% in April 2020 before falling back to 11.1% in June 2020. Due to the effects of the COVID-19 pandemic, Q2 GDP in the US fell 32.9% in 2020. The unemployment rate continued its rapid decline falling to 3.9% in 2021. It reached 3.7% in May 2023.

In 2025, the United States labor market experienced a notable shift characterized by stagnant hiring and increased layoffs. According to Reuters, between January and September 2025, U.S. companies announced approximately 950,000 job cuts, with the technology, retail, and government sectors accounting for the largest share. Analysts described this trend as a transition from a “no hire, no fire” environment to a “no hire, more fire” phase, reflecting rising corporate caution and slowing economic momentum.

Economic data released in late 2025 indicated emerging signs of a slowdown in the U.S. economy. The unemployment rate rose to 4.6% in November, its highest level since 2021, while job creation slowed, with only 64,000 jobs added, down from previous months.

Partial data also showed a decline in employment in October, with analysts noting weaker hiring momentum amid elevated inflation and higher borrowing costs. At the same time, retail sales remained flat at the start of the holiday season, raising concerns about consumer spending, which accounts for a large share of U.S. economic activity.

The US economy began 2026 still in a "high vacancy" position on the Beveridge curve, which looks at the relationship between job openings and unemployment. By the end of January 2026, hiring and layoff rates continued to be low, allowing unemployment to stay range-bound. The low number of job openings, however, means that if layoffs were to increase then unemployment would comparatively increase as well.

=== Employment by sector ===
U.S. employment, as estimated in 2012, is divided into 79.7% in the service sector, 19.2% in the manufacturing sector, and 1.1% in the agriculture sector.

== Income and wealth ==
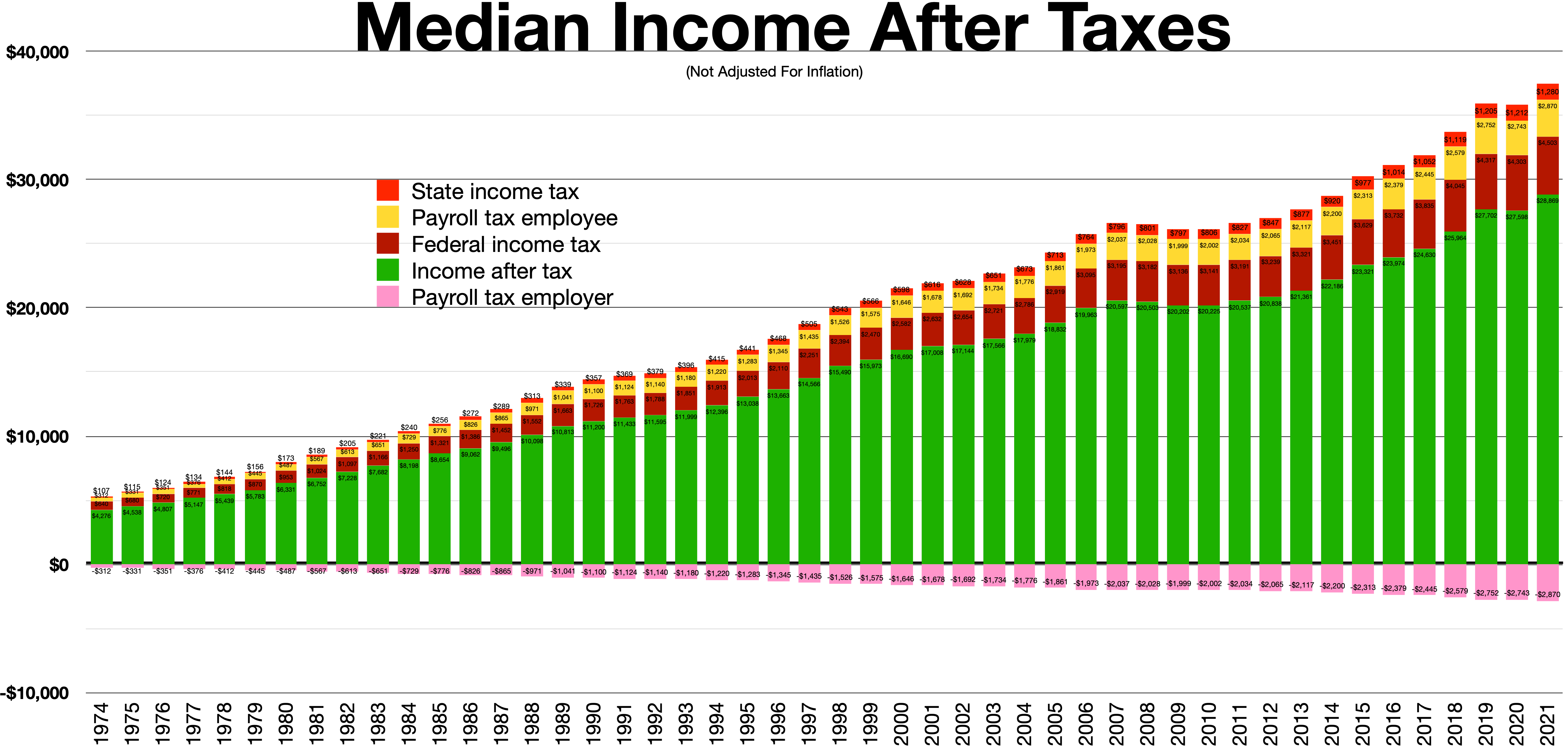
Median personal income after taxes not adjusted for inflation State income tax Payroll tax employee side Federal income tax Median income after tax Payroll tax employer side

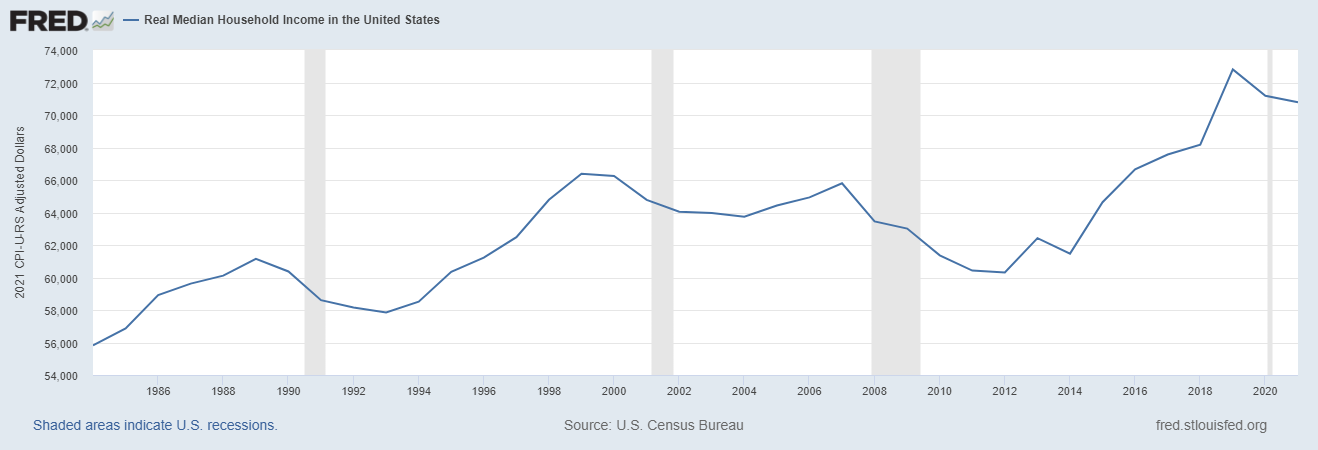
U.S. real median household income (1984–2021)

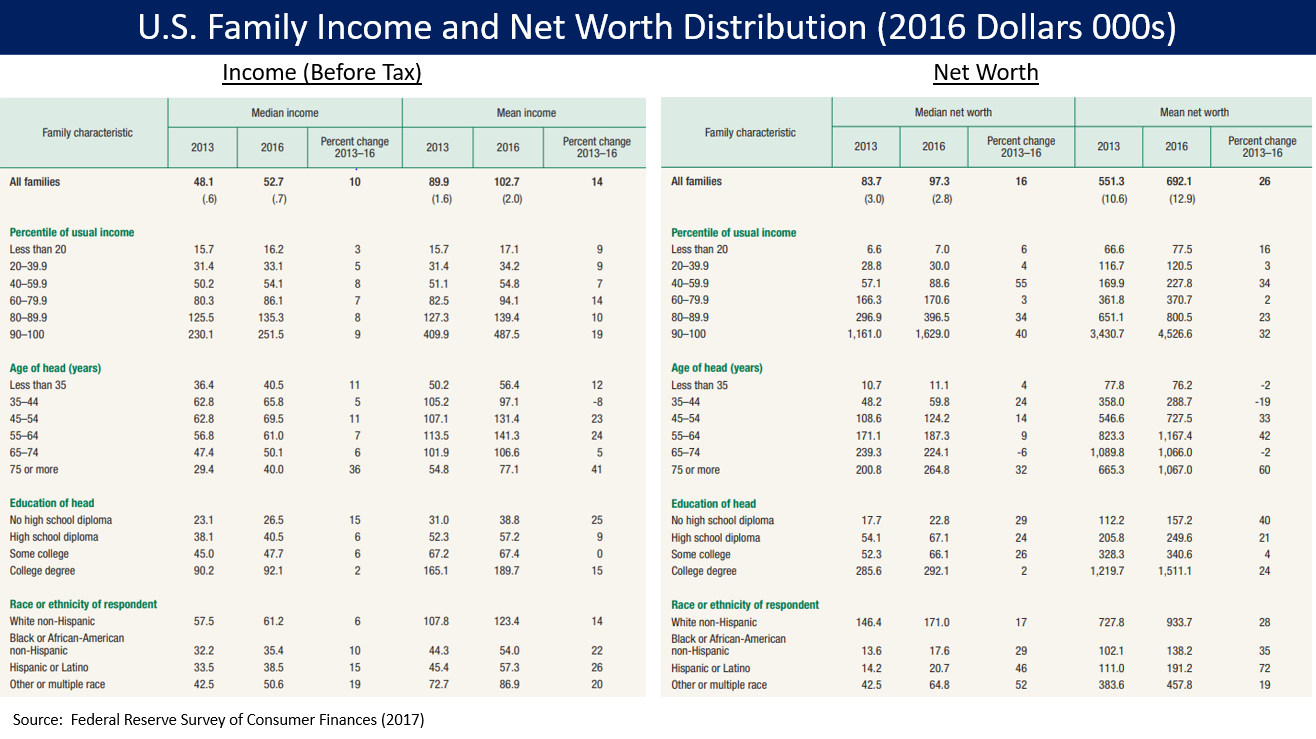
U.S. family pre-tax income and net worth distribution for 2013 and 2016, from the Federal Reserve Survey of Consumer Finances

=== Income measures ===
The American daily per person median income was $70 (PPP) in 2023, one of the highest in the world. Real (i.e., inflation-adjusted) median household income, a good measure of middle-class income, was $59,039 in 2016, a record level. However, it was just above the previous record set in 1998, indicating the purchasing power of middle-class family income has been stagnant or down for much of the past twenty years. According to one analysis middle-class incomes in the United States fell into a tie with those in Canada in 2010, and may have fallen behind by 2014, while several other advanced economies have closed the gap in recent years.

Americans have the highest average household income among OECD nations. During 2013, employee compensation was $8.969 trillion, while gross private investment totals $2.781 trillion.

=== Income inequality ===
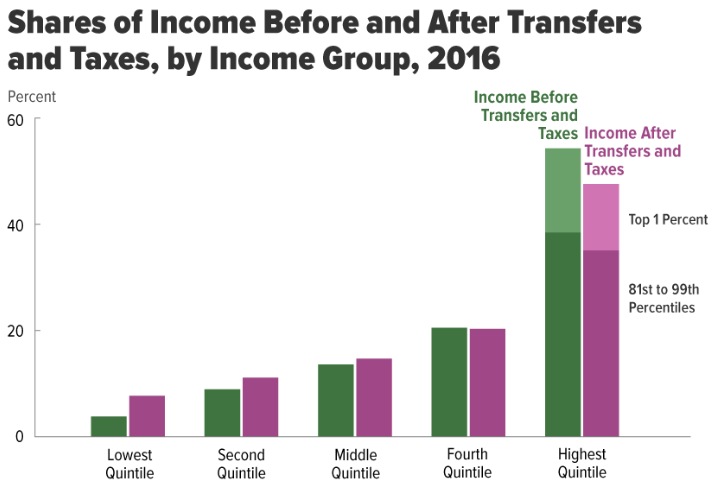
Income before (green) and after (pink) taxes and transfer payments for different income groups starting with the lowest quintile

Income inequality has fluctuated considerably in the United States since measurements began around 1915, moving in an arc between peaks in the 1920s and 2000s, with a lower level of inequality from approximately 1950-1980 (a period named the Great Compression), followed by increasing inequality, in what has been coined as the great divergence.

The U.S. has the highest level of income inequality among its (post-industrialized) peers. When measured for all households, U.S. income inequality is comparable to other developed countries before taxes and transfers, but is among the highest after taxes and transfers, meaning the U.S. shifts relatively less income from higher income households to lower income households. In 2016, average market income was $15,600 for the lowest quintile and $280,300 for the highest quintile. The degree of inequality accelerated within the top quintile, with the top 1% at $1.8 million, approximately 30 times the $59,300 income of the middle quintile.

The economic and political impacts of inequality may include slower GDP growth, reduced income mobility, higher poverty rates, greater use of household debt, leading to an increased risk of financial crises, and political polarization. Causes of inequality may include executive compensation increasing relative to the average worker, financialization, greater industry concentration, lower unionization rates, lower effective tax rates on higher incomes, and technology changes that reward higher educational attainment.

Measurement is debated, as inequality measures vary significantly, for example, across datasets or whether the measurement is taken based on cash compensation (market income) or after taxes and transfer payments. The Gini coefficient is a widely accepted statistic that allows comparisons across jurisdictions, with 0 indicating perfect equality and 1 indicating maximum inequality. Further, various public and private data sets measure those incomes, e.g., from the Congressional Budget Office (CBO), the Internal Revenue Service, and Census. According to the Census Bureau, income inequality reached then record levels in 2018, with a Gini of 0.485, Since then the Census Bureau have given values of 0.488 in 2020 and 0.494 in 2021, per pre-tax money income. For 2025, the Census Bureau reported a Gini index of 0.490 for pretax money income, a change from 2024 that was not statistically significant.

U.S. tax and transfer policies are progressive and therefore reduce effective income inequality, as rates of tax generally increase as taxable income increases. As a group, the lowest earning workers, especially those with dependents, pay no income taxes and may actually receive a small subsidy from the federal government (from child credits and the Earned Income Tax Credit). The 2016 U.S. Gini coefficient was .59 based on market income; it was reduced to .42 after taxes and transfers, according to Congressional Budget Office (CBO) figures. The top 1% share of market income rose from 9.6% in 1979 to a peak of 20.7% in 2007, before falling to 17.5% by 2016. After taxes and transfers, these figures were 7.4%, 16.6%, and 12.5%, respectively.

=== Household net worth and wealth inequality ===
Net personal wealth in the U.S. since 1962

The average personal wealth of people in the top 1% is more than a thousand times that of people in bottom 50%.

The logarithmic scale shows how wealth has increased for all percentile groups, though moreso for wealthier people.

As of Q4 2017, total household net worth in the United States was a record $99 trillion, an increase of $5.2 trillion from 2016. This increase reflects both stock market and housing price gains. This measure has been setting records since Q4 2012. If divided evenly, the $99 trillion represents an average of $782,000 per household (for about 126.2 million households) or $302,000 per person. However, median household net worth (i.e., half of the families above and below this level) was $97,300 in 2016. The bottom 25% of families had a median net worth of zero, while the 25th to 50th percentile had a median net worth of $40,000.

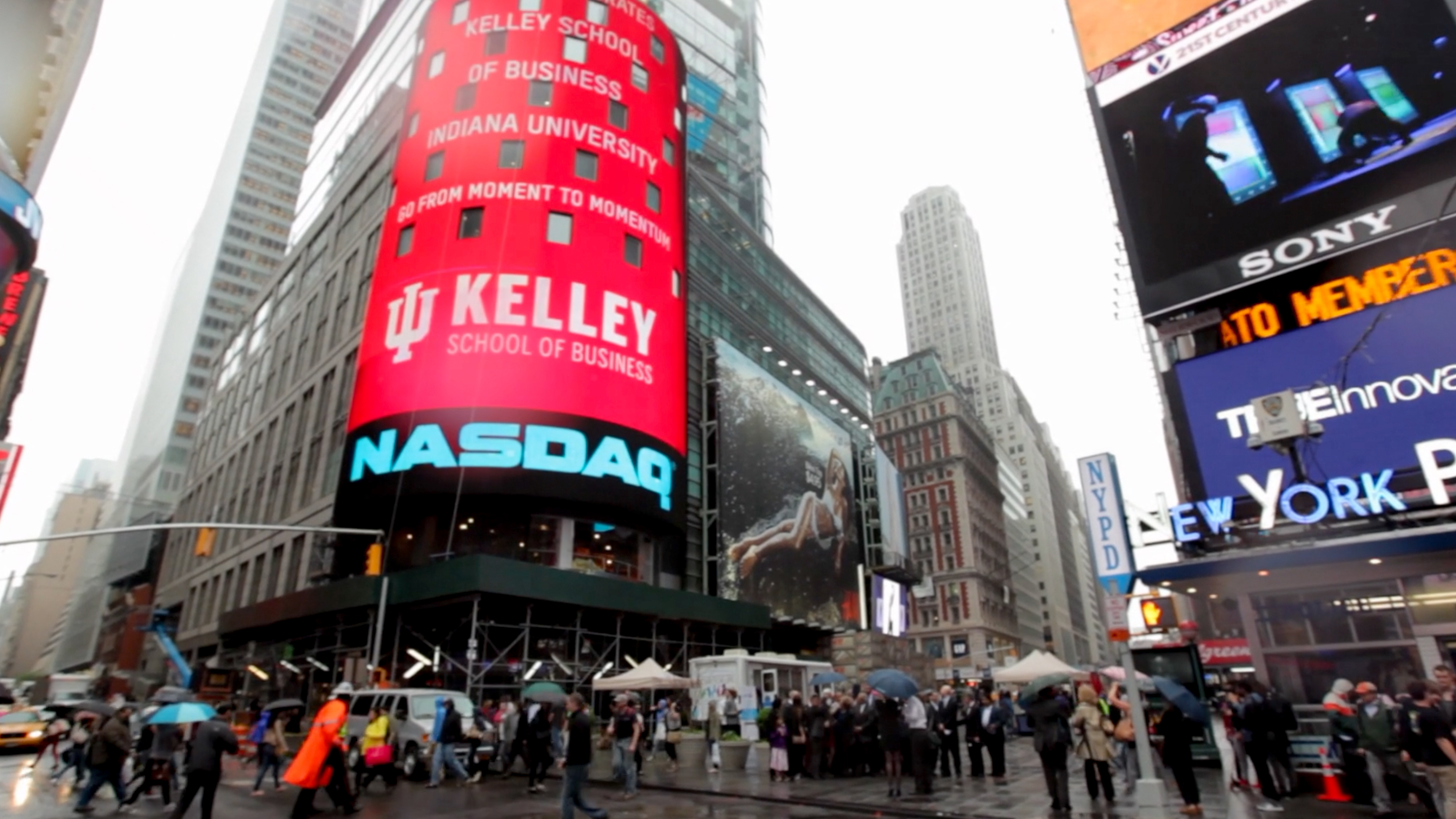

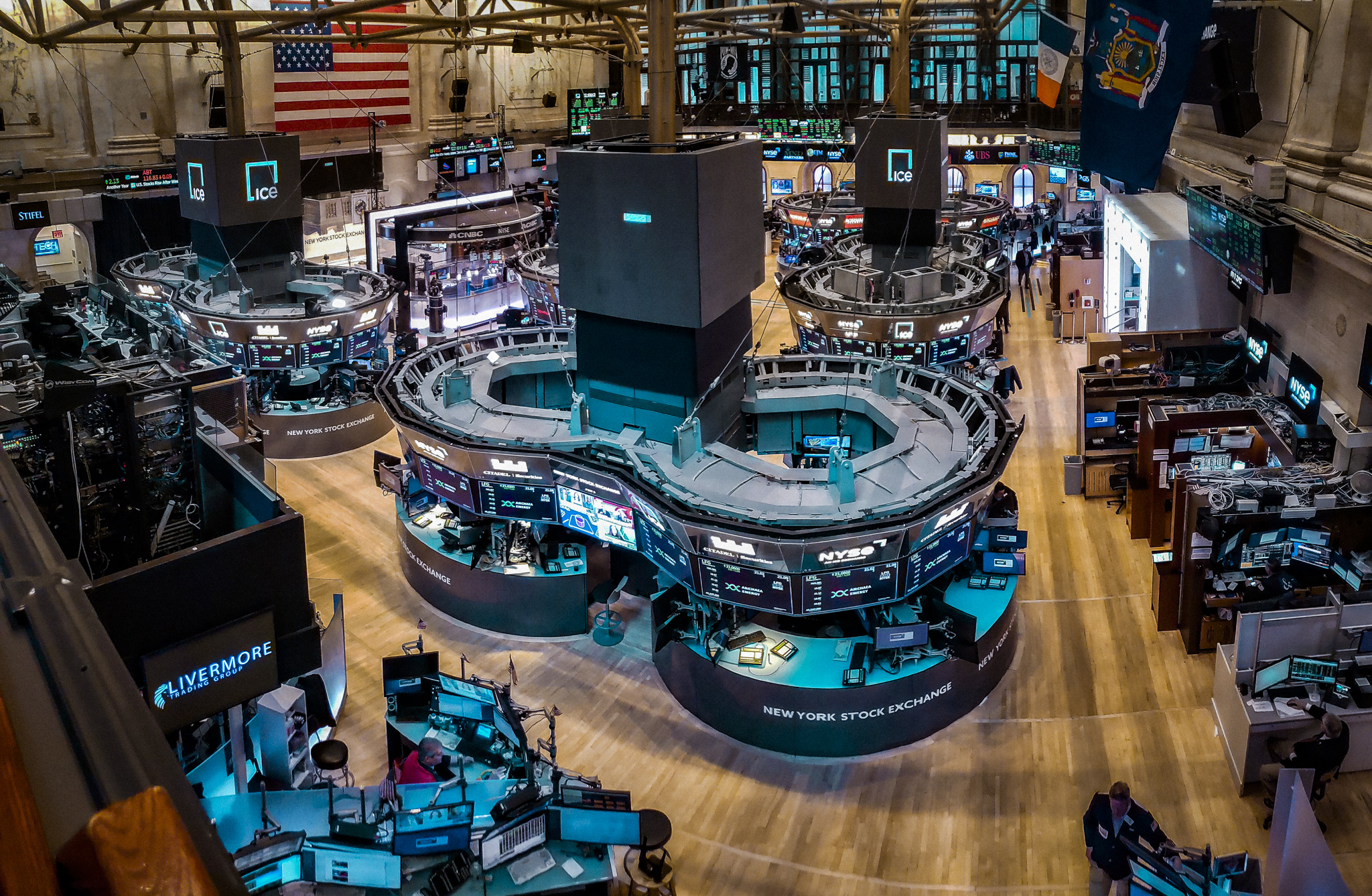
The NASDAQ in Times Square (top) and the NYSE on Wall Street (below) are the world's two largest stock exchanges by total market capitalization of their listed companies.

Wealth inequality is more unequal than income inequality, with the top 1% households owning approximately 42% of the net worth in 2012, versus 24% in 1979. According to a September 2017 report by the Federal Reserve, wealth inequality is at record highs; the top 1% controlled 38.6% of the country's wealth in 2016. The Boston Consulting Group posited in June 2017 report that 1% of the Americans will control 70% of country's wealth by 2021.

The top 10% wealthiest possess 80% of all financial assets. Wealth inequality in the U.S. is greater than in most developed countries other than Sweden. Inherited wealth may help explain why many Americans who have become rich may have had a "substantial head start". In September 2012, according to the Institute for Policy Studies, "over 60 percent" of the Forbes richest 400 Americans "grew up in substantial privilege". Median household wealth fell 35% in the U.S., from $106,591 to $68,839 between 2005 and 2011, due to the Great Recession, but has since recovered as indicated above.

About 30% of the entire world's millionaire population resides in the United States (as of 2009). The Economist Intelligence Unit estimated in 2008 that there were 16,600,000 millionaires in the U.S. Furthermore, 34% of the world's billionaires are American (in 2011).

=== Home ownership ===
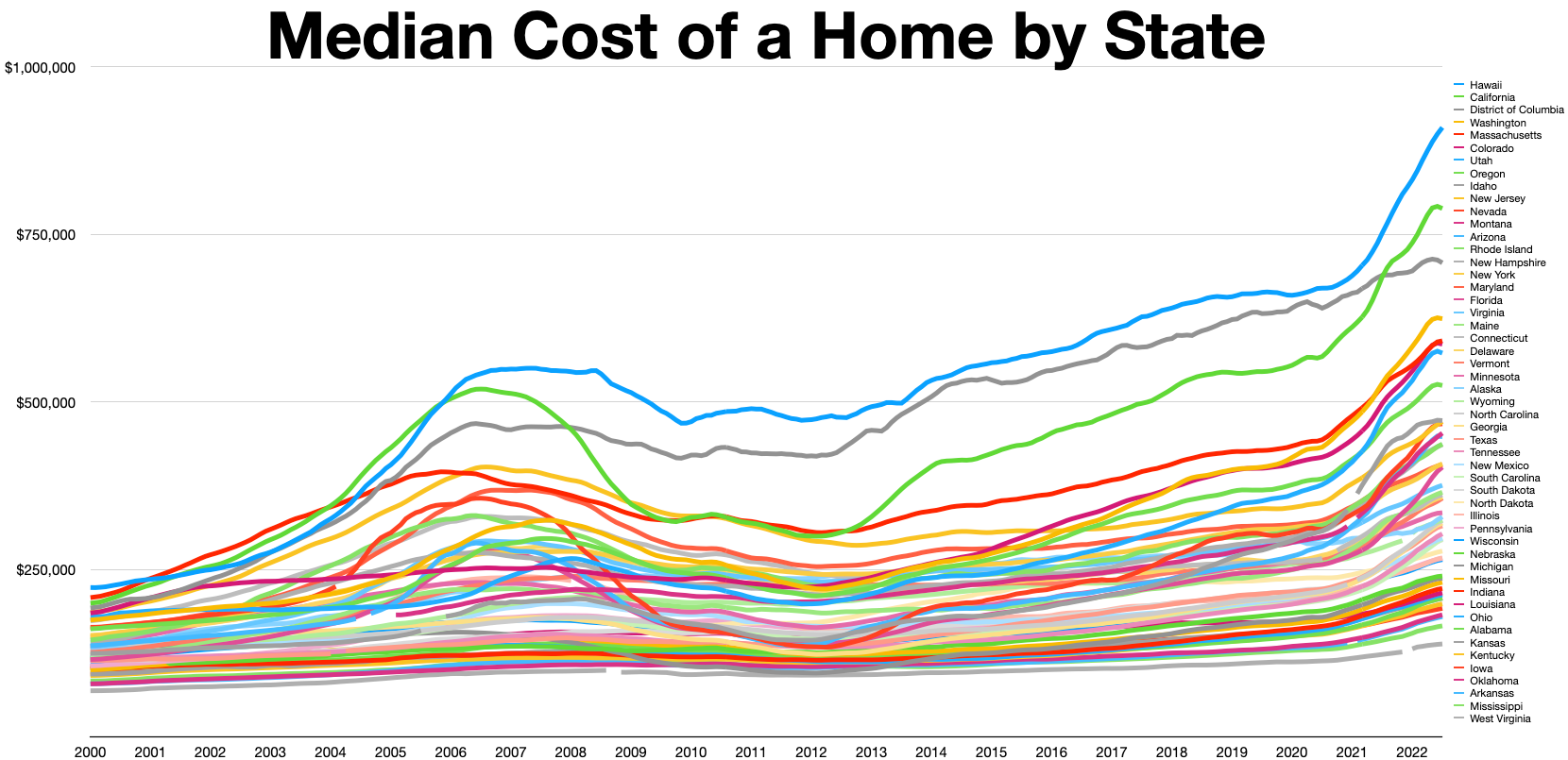
Cost of housing by State

The U.S. home ownership rate in Q1 2018 was 64.2%, well below the all-time peak of 69.2% set in Q4 2004 during a housing bubble. Millions of homes were lost to foreclosure during the Great Recession of 2007–2009, bringing the ownership rate to a trough of 62.9% in Q2 2016. The average ownership rate from 1965 to 2017 was 65.3%.

The average home in the United States has more than 700 square feet per person (65 square meters), which is 50%–100% more than the average in other high-income countries. Similarly, ownership rates of gadgets and amenities are relatively high compared to other countries.

It was reported by Pew Research Center in 2016 that, for the first time in 130 years, Americans aged 18 to 34 are more likely to live with their parents than in any other housing situation.

In one study by ATTOM Data Solutions, in 70% of the counties surveyed, homes are increasingly unaffordable for the average U.S. worker.

As of 2018, the number of U.S. citizens residing in their vehicles increased in major cities with significantly higher than average housing costs such as Los Angeles, Portland and San Francisco.

According to CNBC, the median sale price for a U.S. home in 2017 was US$199,200. By February 2023, the median U.S. home sale price grew to US$392,000 according to Statista. The US has a country-wide housing shortage caused by insufficient housing construction (which declined severely after the 2008 Great Recession), and has caused rents and home prices to rise to increasingly unaffordable levels, with one estimate of the shortage being 3.8 million units in 2019, with this shortage having gotten worse during and since the pandemic.

As of January 2024, in roughly half of cities in the U.S., workers need incomes of $100,000 or more in order to purchase a home as a result of rising housing prices and interest rate hikes.

=== Profits and wages ===
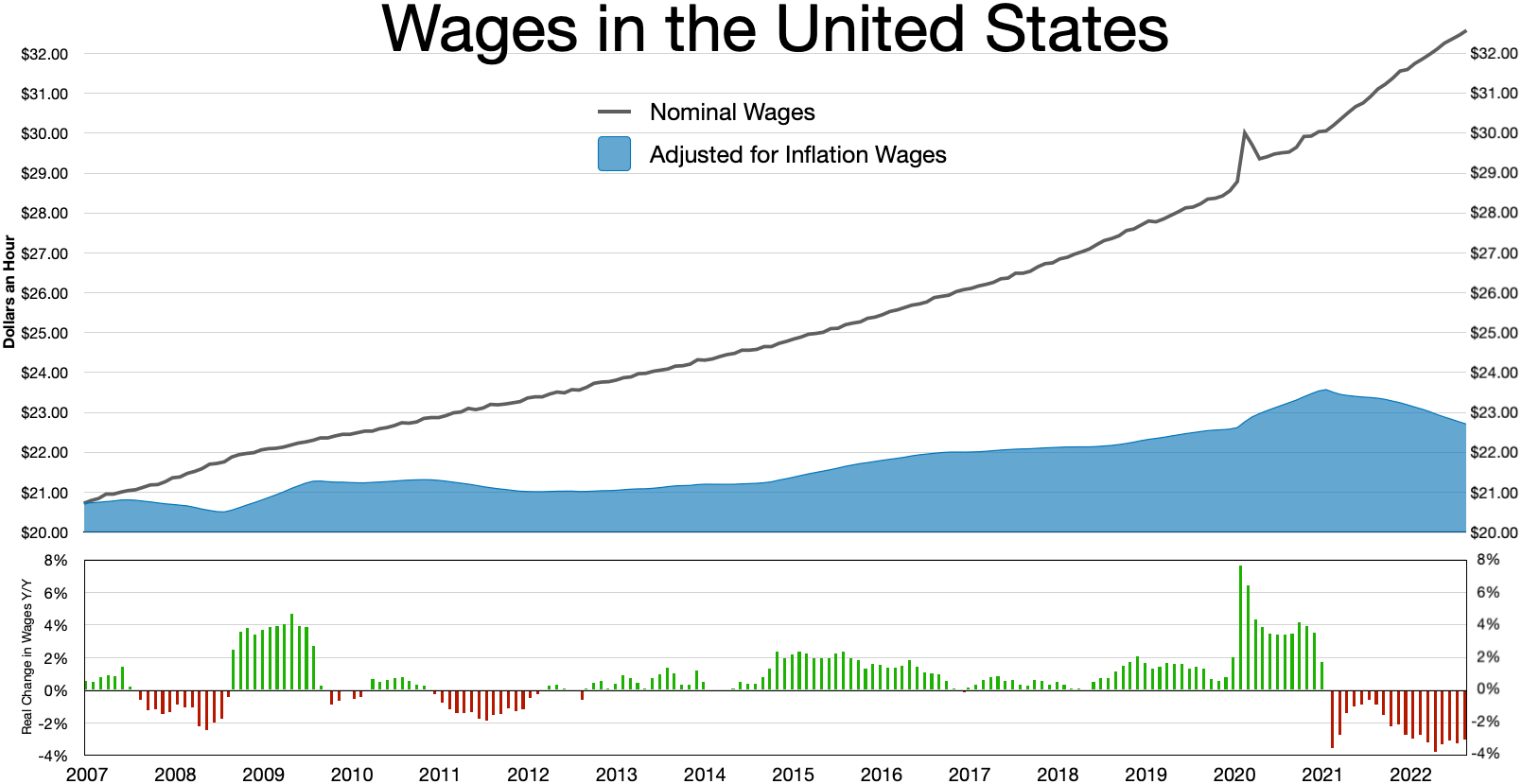
Wages in the United States Nominal wages Adjusted for inflation wages

Real wages (wages adjusted for inflation) for most workers in the United States and median incomes have either declined or remained stagnant for the last twenty to forty years. A 2020 microanalysis demonstrated that in the preceding four decades labor's share of national output declined while over the same period the profit share of the same output increased.

In 1970, wages represented more than 51% of the U.S. GDP and profits were less than 5%. But by 2013, wages had fallen to 44% of the economy, while profits had more than doubled to 11%. Inflation-adjusted ("real") per capita disposable personal income rose steadily in the U.S. from 1945 to 2008, but has since remained generally level.

In 2005, median personal income for those over the age of 18 ranged from $3,317 for an unemployed, married Asian American female to $55,935 for a full-time, year-round employed Asian American male. According to the U.S. Census men tended to have higher income than women while Asians and Whites earned more than African Americans and Hispanics. The overall median personal income for all individuals over the age of 18 was $24,062 ($32,140 for those age 25 or above) in the year 2005.

As a reference point, the minimum wage rate in 2009 and 2017 was $7.25 per hour or $15,080 for the 2080 hours in a typical work year. The minimum wage is a little more than the poverty level for a single person unit and about 50% of the poverty level for a family of four.

According to an October 2014 report by the Pew Research Center, real wages have been flat or falling for the last five decades for most U.S. workers, regardless of job growth. Bloomberg reported in July 2018 that real GDP per capita has grown substantially since the Great Recession.

An August 2017 survey by CareerBuilder found that eight out of ten U.S. workers live paycheck to paycheck. CareerBuilder spokesman Mike Erwin blamed "stagnant wages and the rising cost of everything from education to many consumer goods". According to a survey by the federal Consumer Financial Protection Bureau on the financial well-being of U.S. citizens, roughly half have trouble paying bills, and more than one third have faced hardships such as not being able to afford a place to live, running out of food, or not having enough money to pay for medical care. According to journalist and author Alissa Quart, the cost of living is rapidly outpacing the growth of salaries and wages, including those for traditionally secure professions such as teaching. She writes that "middle-class life is now 30% more expensive than it was 20 years ago."

In February 2019, the Federal Reserve Bank of New York reported that seven million U.S. citizens are three months or more behind on their car payments, setting a record. This is considered a red flag by economists, that Americans are struggling to pay bills in spite of a low unemployment rate. A May 2019 poll conducted by NPR found that among rural Americans, 40% struggle to pay for healthcare, food and housing, and 49% could not pay cash for a $1,000 emergency, and would instead choose to borrow in order to pay for such an unexpected emergency expense. Some experts assert that the US has experienced a "two-tier recovery", which has benefitted 60% of the population, while the other 40% on the "lower tier" have been struggling to pay bills as the result of stagnant wages, increases in the cost of housing, education and healthcare, and growing debts.

A 2021 study by the National Low Income Housing Coalition found that workers would have to make at least $24.90 an hour to be able to afford (meaning 30% of a person's income or less) renting a standard two-bedroom home or $20.40 for a one-bedroom home anywhere in the US. The former is 3.4 times higher than the current federal minimum wage.

The USCB reported in September 2023 that incomes fell last year by 2.3% from 2021, which is the third consecutive year incomes have declined.

According to a 2026 analysis by Federal Reserve economists, American workers' share of national income has fallen to the lowest level since 1947, with corporations and wealthy investors taking an ever greater portion.

=== Poverty ===
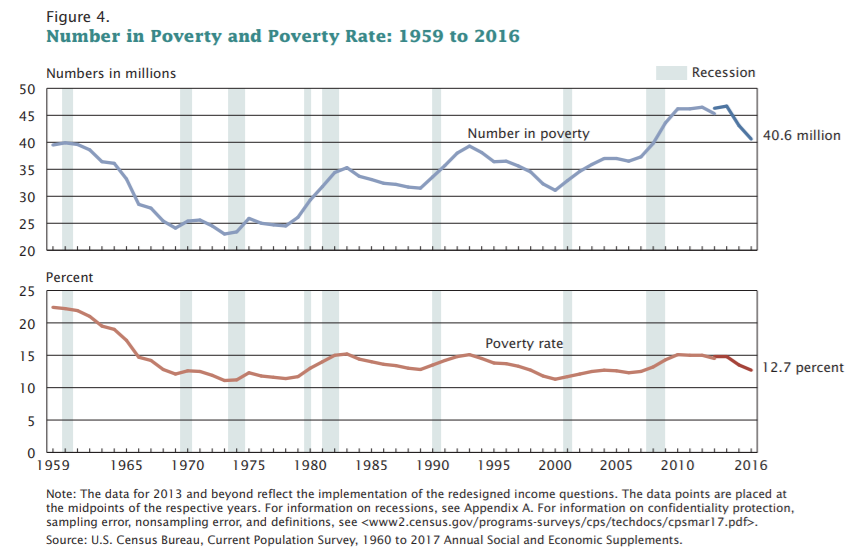
Number in poverty and poverty rate: 1959 to 2016. United States.

Starting in the 1980s relative poverty rates have consistently exceeded those of other wealthy nations, though analyses using a common data set for comparisons tend to find that the U.S. has a lower absolute poverty rate by market income than most other wealthy nations. Extreme poverty in the United States, meaning households living on less than $2 per day before government benefits, doubled from 1996 levels to 1.5 million households in 2011, including 2.8 million children. In 2013, child poverty reached record high levels, with 16.7 million children living in food insecure households, about 35% more than 2007 levels. As of 2015, 44 percent of children in the United States live with low-income families.

In 2016, 12.7% of the U.S. population lived in poverty, down from 13.5% in 2015. The poverty rate rose from 12.5% in 2007 before the Great Recession to a 15.1% peak in 2010, before falling back to just above the 2007 level. In the 1959–1962 period, the poverty rate was over 20%, but declined to the all-time low of 11.1% in 1973 following the War on Poverty begun during the Lyndon Johnson presidency. In June 2016, The IMF warned the United States that its high poverty rate needs to be tackled urgently.

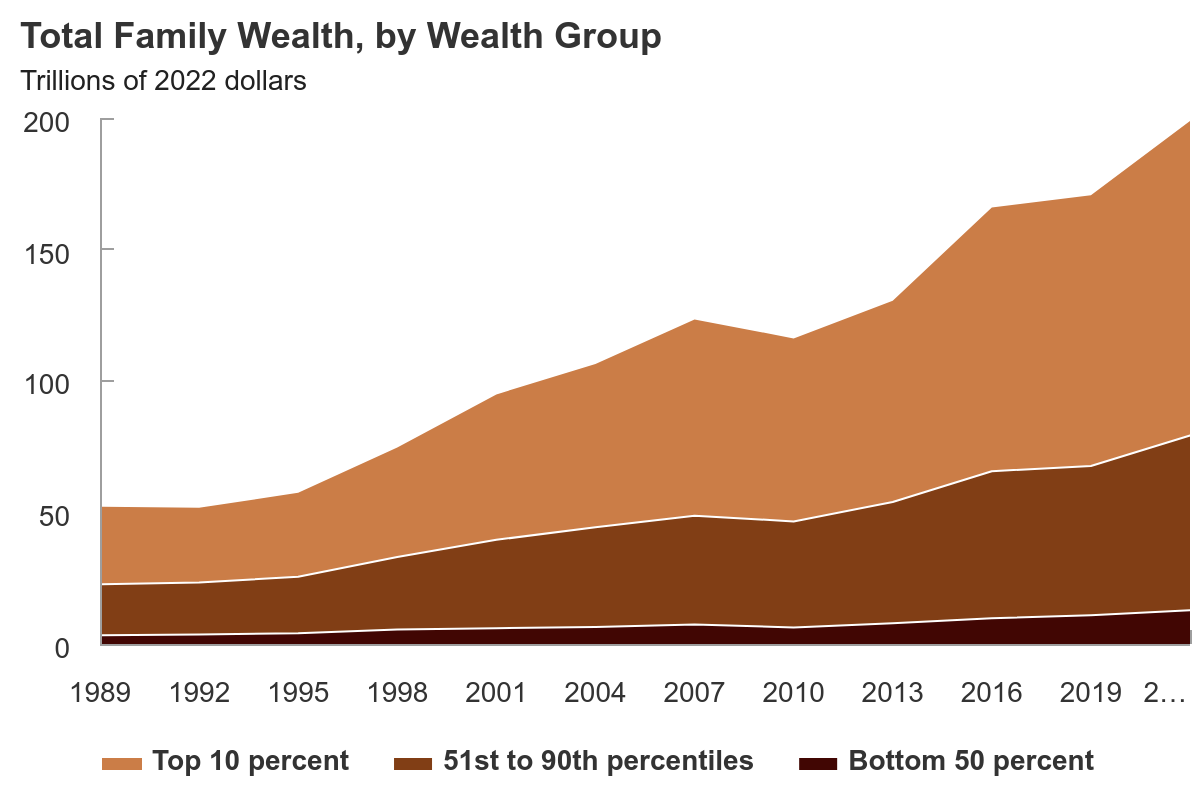
Wealth inequality in the United States increased from 1989 to 2013.

The population in extreme-poverty neighborhoods rose by one third from 2000 to 2009. People living in such neighborhoods tend to suffer from inadequate access to quality education; higher crime rates; higher rates of physical and psychological ailment; limited access to credit and wealth accumulation; higher prices for goods and services; and constrained access to job opportunities. As of 2013, 44% of America's poor are considered to be in "deep poverty", with an income 50% or more below the government's official poverty line.

According to the US Department of Housing and Urban Development's Annual Homeless Assessment Report, as of 2024 there were around 771,480 homeless people in the United States on a given night, or about 23 of every 10,000 people. Almost two thirds stayed in an emergency shelter or transitional housing program and the other third were living on the street, in an abandoned building, or another place not meant for human habitation. About 1.56 million people, or about 0.5% of the U.S. population, used an emergency shelter or a transitional housing program between October 1, 2008, and September 30, 2009. Around 44% of homeless people are employed. Homelessness increased from 2016 to 2020, along with deaths among the homeless population.

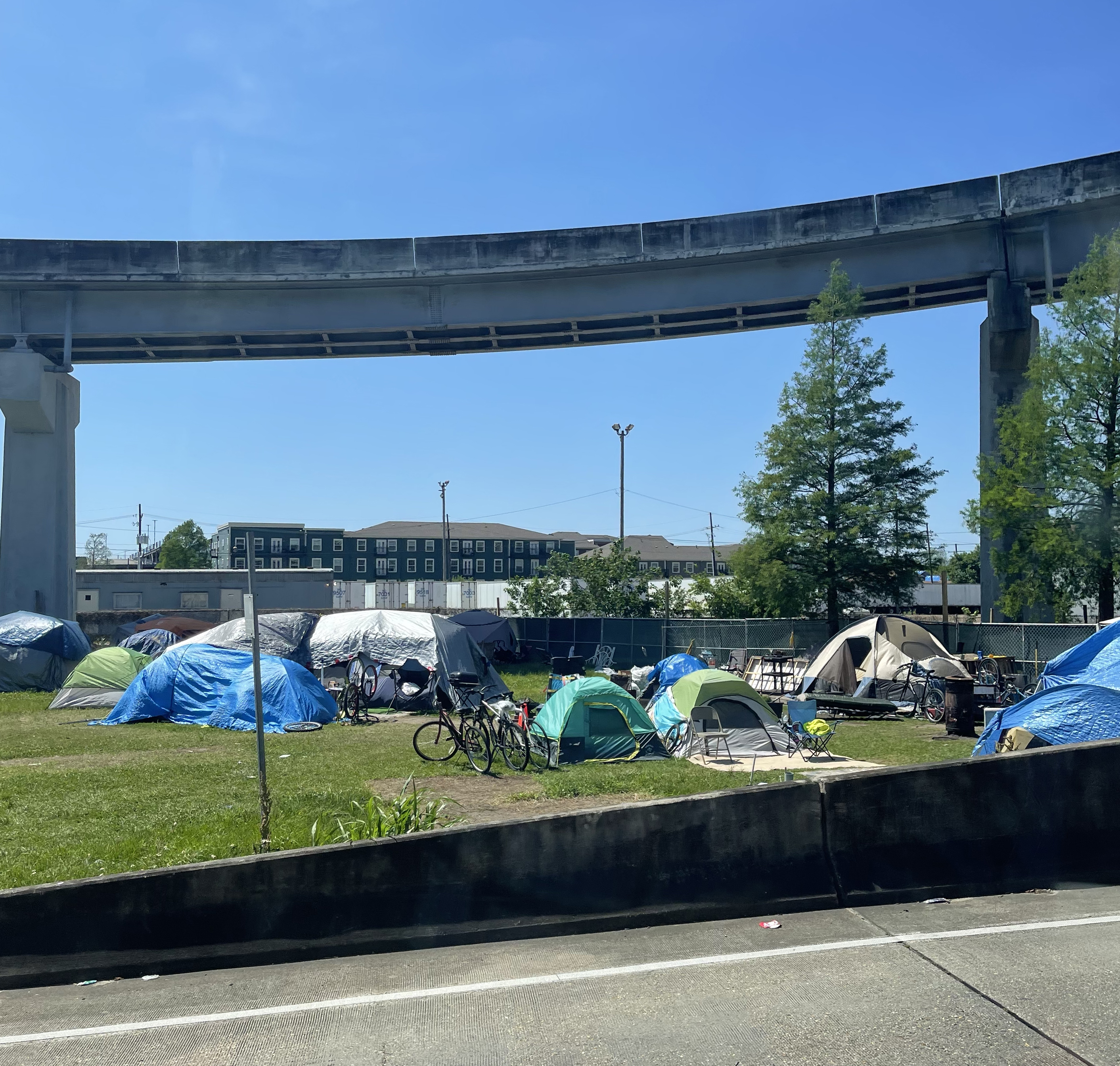
A homeless camp in New Orleans, March 2023

The United States has one of the least extensive social safety nets in the developed world, reducing both relative poverty and absolute poverty by considerably less than the mean for wealthy nations. Poverty rates in the US are higher and the conditions of those in poverty more extreme compared to other Western countries. Some experts posit that those in poverty live in conditions rivaling the developing world. A May 2018 report by the U.N. Special Rapporteur on extreme poverty and human rights found that over five million people in the United States live "in 'Third World' conditions". Poverty is the fourth leading risk factor for premature death annually, according to a 2023 study published in JAMA. Over the last three decades the poor in America have been incarcerated at a much higher rate than their counterparts in other developed nations, with penal confinement being "commonplace for poor men of working age". Some scholars contend that the shift to neoliberal social and economic policies starting in the late 1970s has expanded the penal state, retrenched the social welfare state, deregulated the economy and criminalized poverty, ultimately "transforming what it means to be poor in America".

Sociologist Matthew Desmond writes in his 2023 book Poverty, by America that the US "offers some of the lowest wages in the industrialized world", which has "swelled the ranks of the working poor, most of whom are thirty-five or older". Social scientist Mark Robert Rank asserts that the high rates of poverty in the U.S. can largely be explained as structural failures at the economic and political levels.

== Health care ==
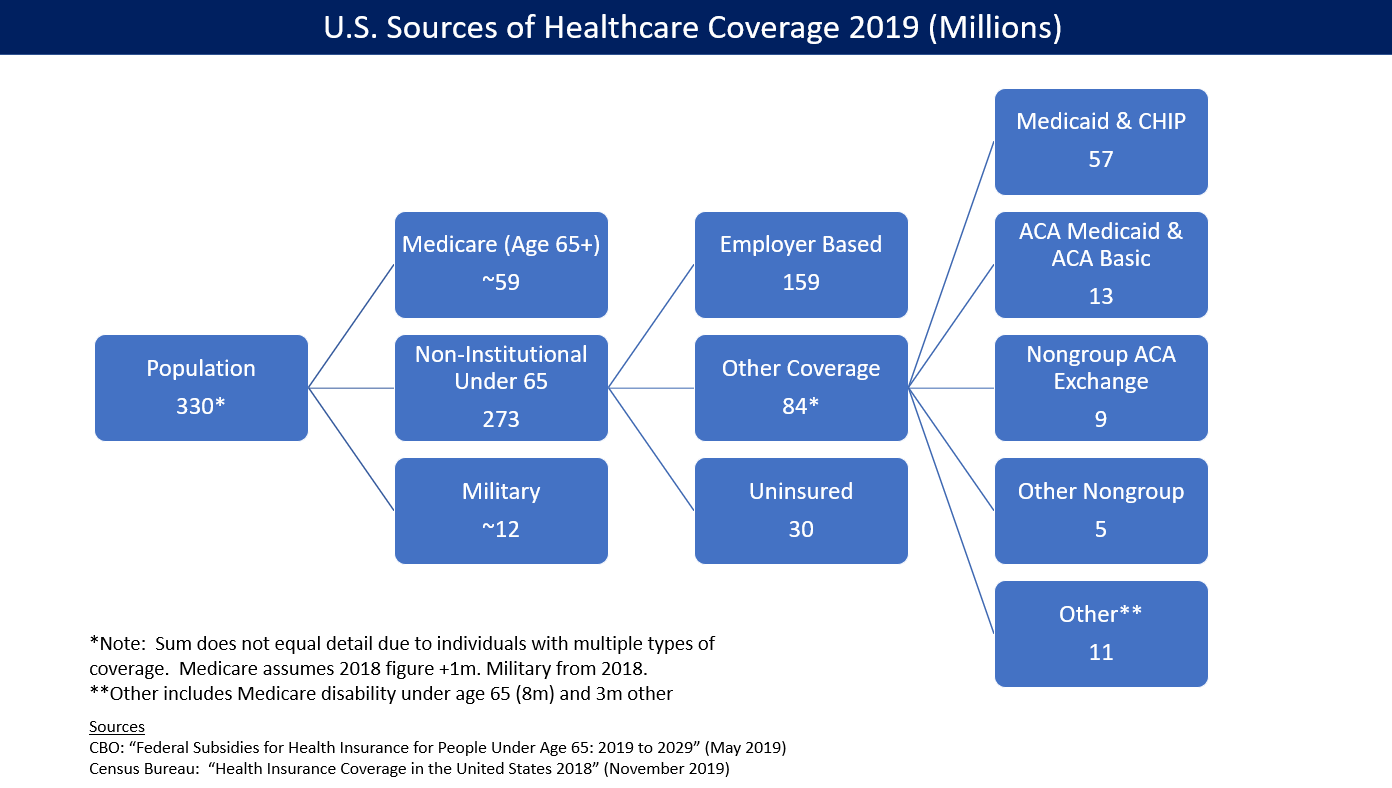
U.S. health insurance coverage by source in 2016. CBO estimated ACA/Obamacare was responsible for 23 million persons covered via exchanges and Medicaid expansion.

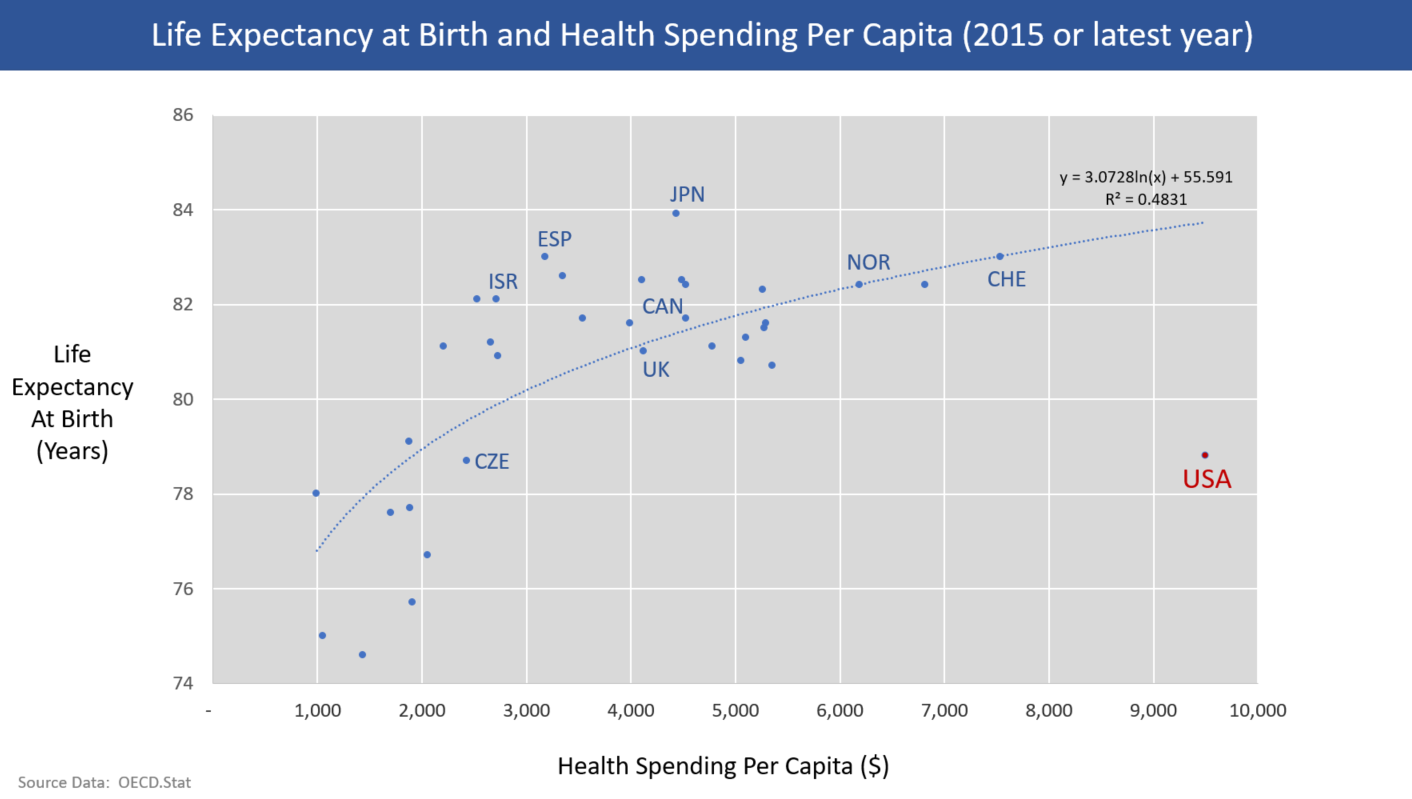
Chart showing life expectancy at birth and health care spending per capita for OECD countries as of 2015. The U.S. is an outlier, with much higher spending but below average life expectancy.

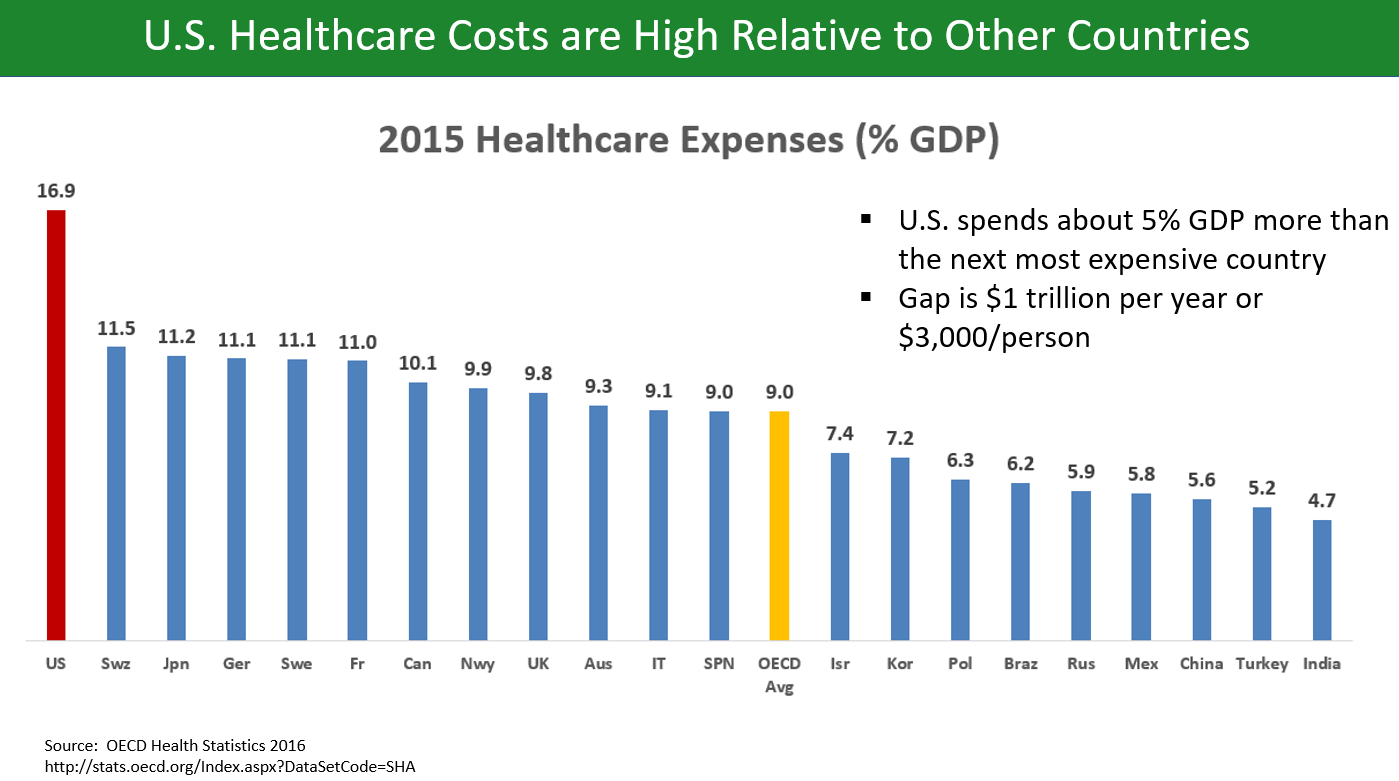
Bar chart comparing healthcare costs as percentage of GDP across OECD countries

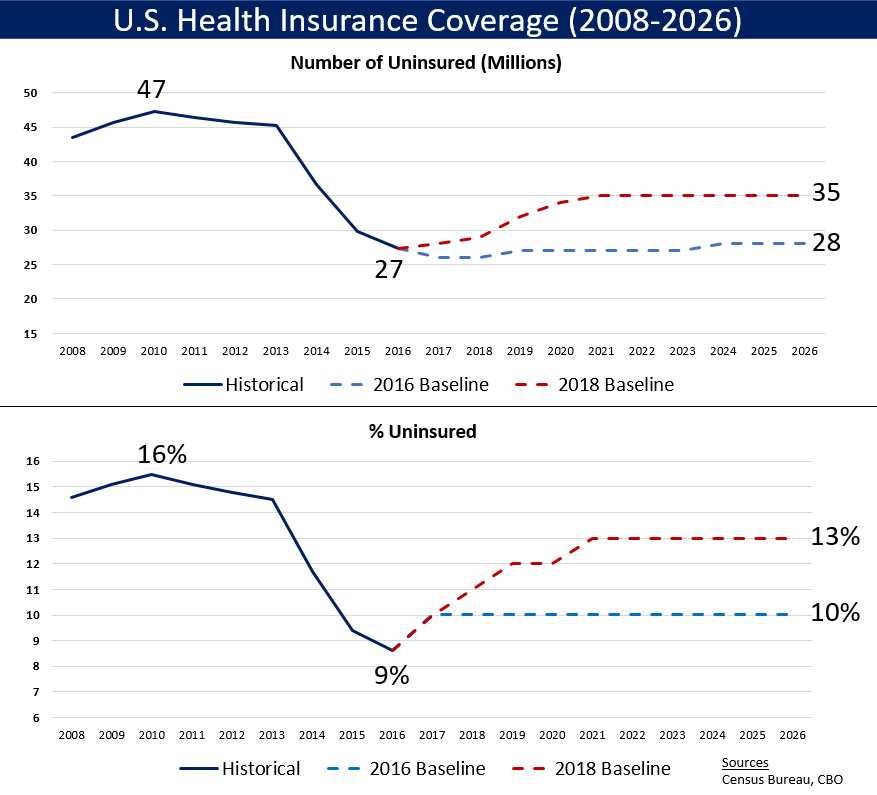
U.S. uninsured number (millions) and rate (%), including historical data through 2016 and two CBO forecasts (2016/Obama policy and 2018/Trump policy) through 2026. Two key reasons for more uninsured under President Trump include: 1) Eliminating the individual mandate to have health insurance; and 2) Stopping cost sharing reduction payments.

=== Coverage ===
The American system is a mix of public and private insurance. The government provides insurance coverage for approximately 53 million elderly via Medicare, 62 million lower-income persons via Medicaid, and 15 million military veterans via the Veteran's Administration. About 178 million employed by companies receive subsidized health insurance through their employer, while 52 million other persons directly purchase insurance either via the subsidized marketplace exchanges developed as part of the Affordable Care Act or directly from insurers. The private sector delivers healthcare services, with the exception of the Veteran's Administration, where doctors are employed by the government.

Multiple surveys indicate the number of uninsured fell between 2013 and 2016 due to expanded Medicaid eligibility and health insurance exchanges established due to the Patient Protection and Affordable Care Act, also known as the "ACA" or "Obamacare". According to the United States Census Bureau, in 2012 there were 45.6 million people in the US (14.8% of the under-65 population) who were without health insurance. This figure fell by 18.3 million (40%) to 27.3 million (8.6% of the under-65 population) by 2016.

However, under President Trump these gains in healthcare coverage have begun to reverse. The Commonwealth Fund estimated in May 2018 that the number of uninsured increased by four million from early 2016 to early 2018. The rate of those uninsured increased from 12.7% in 2016 to 15.5%. The impact was greater among lower-income adults, who had a higher uninsured rate than higher-income adults. Regionally, the South and West had higher uninsured rates than the North and East. Further, those 18 states that have not expanded Medicaid had a higher uninsured rate than those that did.

According to Physicians for a National Health Program, this lack of insurance causes roughly 48,000 unnecessary deaths per year. The group's methodology has been criticized by John C. Goodman for not looking at cause of death or tracking insurance status changes over time, including the time of death. A 2009 study by former Clinton policy adviser Richard Kronick found no increased mortality from being uninsured after certain risk factors were controlled for.

=== Outcomes ===
The U.S. lags in overall healthcare performance but is a global leader in medical innovation. America solely developed or contributed significantly to nine of the top ten most important medical innovations since 1975 as ranked by a 2001 poll of physicians, while the EU and Switzerland together contributed to five. Since 1966, Americans have received more Nobel Prizes in Medicine than the rest of the world combined. From 1989 to 2002, four times more money was invested in private biotechnology companies in America than in Europe.

Of 17 high-income countries studied by the National Institutes of Health in 2013, the United States ranked at or near the top in obesity rate, frequency of automobile use and accidents, homicides, infant mortality rate, incidence of heart and lung disease, sexually transmitted infections, adolescent pregnancies, recreational drug or alcohol deaths, injuries, and rates of disability. Together, such lifestyle and societal factors place the U.S. at the bottom of that list for life expectancy. On average, a U.S. male can be expected to live almost four fewer years than those in the top-ranked country, though Americans who reach age 75 live longer than those who reach that age in peer nations. One consumption choice causing several of the maladies described above are cigarettes. Americans smoked 258 billion cigarettes in 2016. Cigarettes cost the United States $326 billion each year in direct healthcare costs ($170 billion) and lost productivity ($156 billion).

A comprehensive 2007 study by European doctors found the five-year cancer survival rate was significantly higher in the U.S. than in all 21 European nations studied, 66.3% for men versus the European mean of 47.3% and 62.9% versus 52.8% for women. Americans undergo cancer screenings at significantly higher rates than people in other developed countries, and access MRI and CT scans at the highest rate of any OECD nation. People in the U.S. diagnosed with high cholesterol or hypertension access pharmaceutical treatments at higher rates than those diagnosed in other developed nations, and are more likely to successfully control the conditions. Diabetics are more likely to receive treatment and meet treatment targets in the U.S. than in Canada, England, or Scotland.

According to a 2018 study of 2016 data by the Institute for Health Metrics and Evaluation, the U.S. was ranked 27th in the world for healthcare and education, down from 6th in 1990.

=== Cost ===
U.S. healthcare costs are considerably higher than other countries as a share of GDP, among other measures. According to the OECD, U.S. healthcare costs in 2015 were 16.9% GDP, over 5% GDP higher than the next most expensive OECD country. A gap of 5% GDP represents $1 trillion, about $3,000 per person or one-third higher relative to the next most expensive country.

The high cost of health care in the United States is attributed variously to technological advance, administration costs, drug pricing, suppliers charging more for medical equipment, the receiving of more medical care than people in other countries, the high wages of doctors, government regulations, the impact of lawsuits, and third party payment systems insulating consumers from the full cost of treatments. The lowest prices for pharmaceuticals, medical devices, and payments to physicians are in government plans. Americans tend to receive more medical care than people do in other countries, which is a notable contributor to higher costs. In the United States, a person is more likely to receive open heart surgery after a heart attack than in other countries. Medicaid pays less than Medicare for many prescription drugs due to the fact Medicaid discounts are set by law, whereas Medicare prices are negotiated by private insurers and drug companies. Government plans often pay less than overhead, resulting in healthcare providers shifting the cost to the privately insured through higher prices.

== Composition of economic sectors ==
=== Primary sectors ===
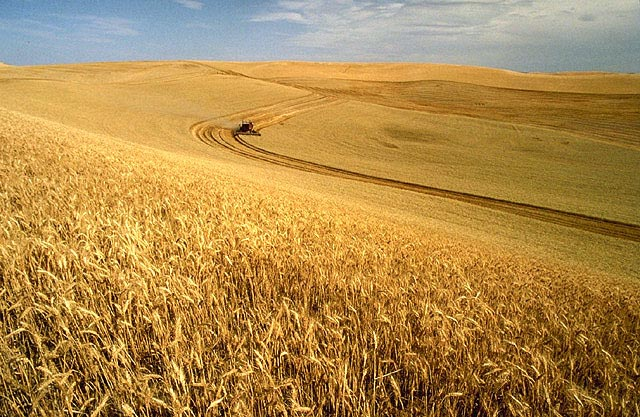
A wheat harvest in Idaho

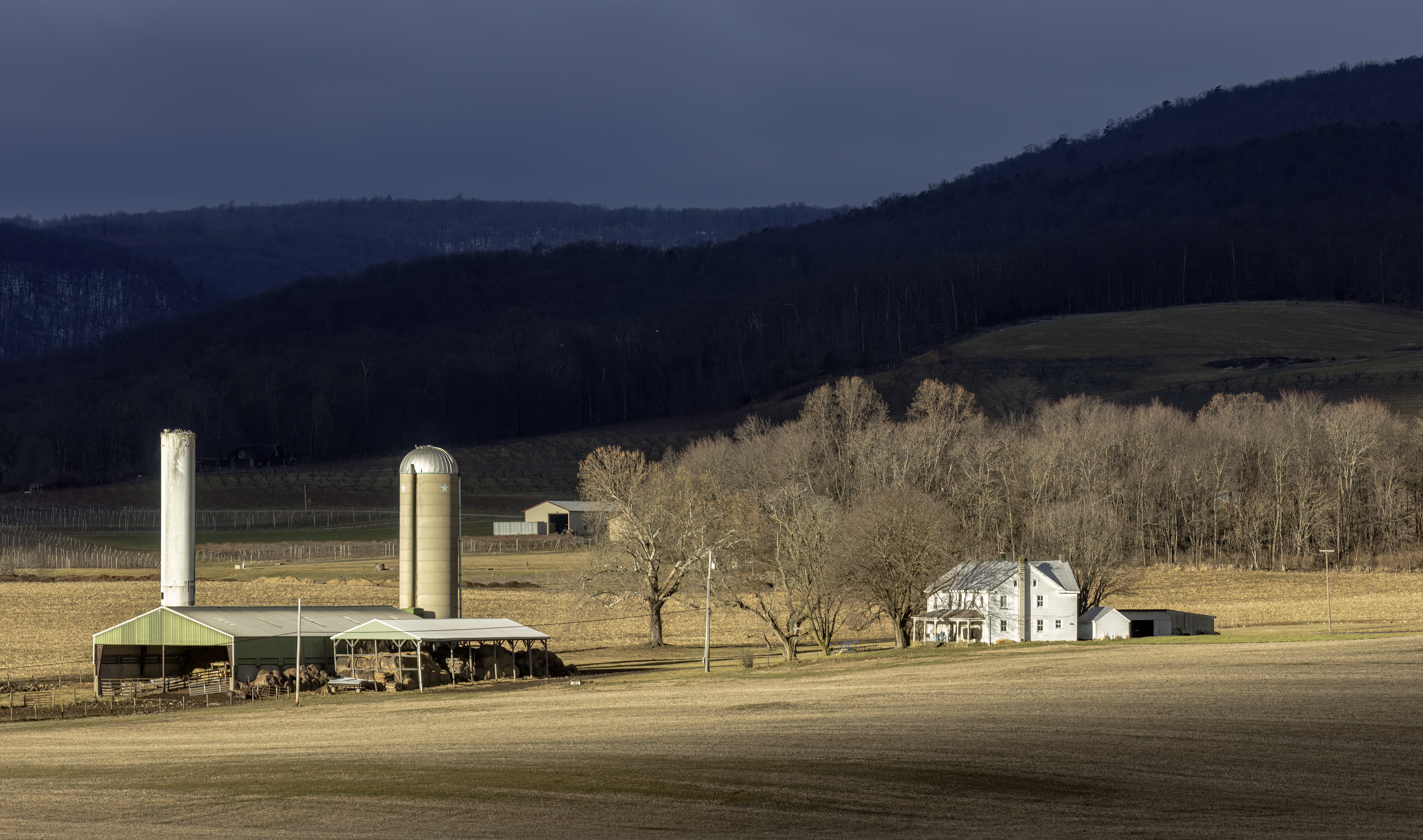
A farm at the base of Catoctin Mountain between Thurmont and Emmitsburg, Maryland.

Agriculture is a major industry in the United States, which is a net exporter of food. As of the 2022 census of agriculture, there were 1.9 million farms (down 6.9% from 2017), covering an area of 880.1 million acres, an average of 463 acres per farm.

Agricultural activity is particularly concentrated in the Central Valley of California and the Great Plains. The Great Plains are a vast expanse of flat arable land in the center of the nation covering an area west of the Great Lakes and east of the Rocky Mountains. The eastern wetter half is a major corn- and soybean-producing region known as the Corn Belt, and the western drier half is known as the Wheat Belt because of its high rate of wheat production. The Central Valley of California produces fruits, vegetables, and nuts. The American South has historically been a large producer of cotton, tobacco, and rice, but it has declined in agricultural production over the past century. California leads the nation in citrus production and is the number two producer of oranges in the world behind only Brazil.

The U.S. has led developments in seed improvement, such as hybridization, and in expanding uses for crops from the work of George Washington Carver to bioplastics and biofuels. The mechanization of farming and intensive farming have been major themes in U.S. history, including John Deere's steel plow, Cyrus McCormick's mechanical reaper, Eli Whitney's cotton gin, and the widespread success of the Fordson tractor and the combine harvester. Modern agriculture in the U.S. ranges from hobby farms and small-scale producers to large commercial farms that cover thousands of acres of cropland or rangeland.

Agricultural products include wheat, corn, other grains, fruits, vegetables, cotton; beef, pork, poultry, dairy products, forest products, and seafood.

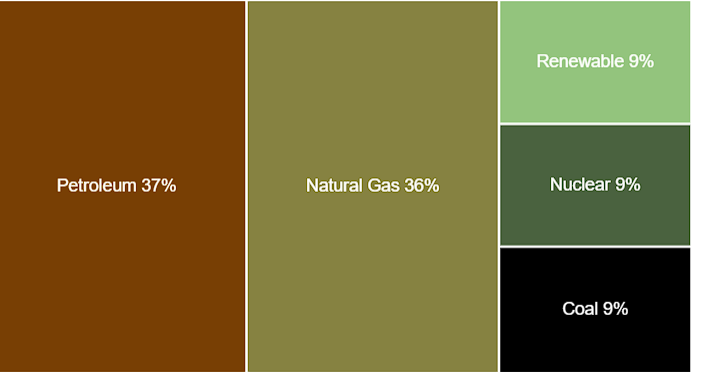
US energy consumption in 2025

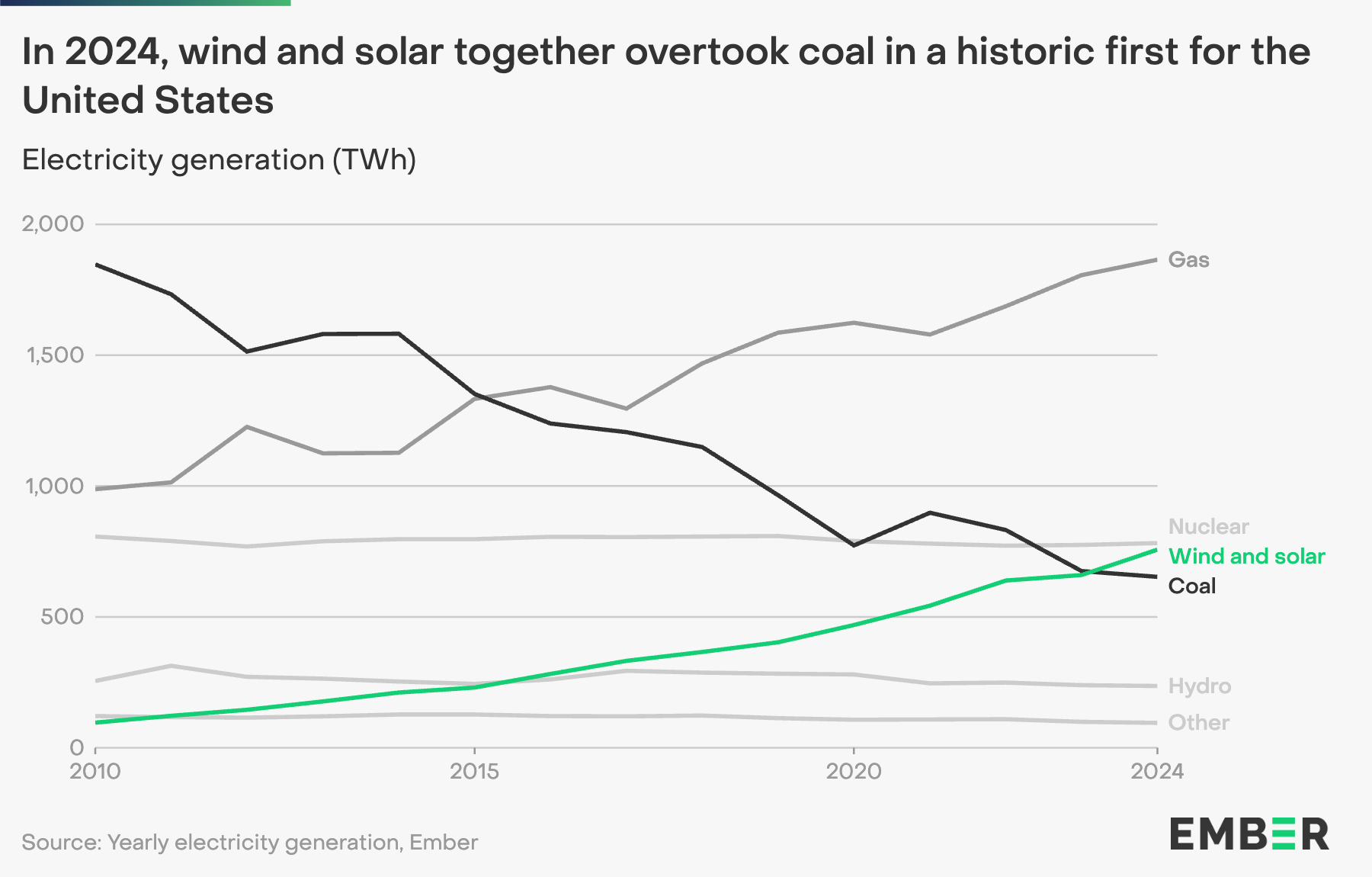
In 2024, wind and solar together overtook coal for the first time in the US. Natural gas remains the largest energy source in the US at 43%.

Energy in the United States is obtained from a variety of sources, although the majority came from fossil fuels in 2025: 37% of the nation's energy originated from petroleum, 36% from natural gas, and 9% from coal. Electricity from nuclear power supplied 9% and renewable energy supplied 9%, which includes biomass, wind, hydro, solar and geothermal. Energy consumption in 2025 was mostly for industry (35%) and transportation (37%), with use in homes (15%) and commercial buildings (13%) making up the remainder. The United States' portion of the electrical grid in North America had a nameplate capacity of 1,281 GW and produced 4,429 TWh in 2025, using 32% of primary energy to do so.

Natural gas overtook coal as the dominant source for electric generation in 2016. Coal was overtaken by nuclear for the first time in 2020 and by renewables in 2023.

Energy figures are measured in BTU, with 1 BTU equal to 1.055 kJ and 1 quadrillion BTU (1 quad) equal to 1.055 EJ. Because BTU is a unit of heat, sources that generate electricity directly are multiplied by a conversion factor to equate them with sources that use a heat engine.

The United States was the second-largest energy producer and consumer in 2024 after China. The United States had a per capita energy consumption of 277 million BTU (292 GJ), ranking it tenth in the world behind Canada, Iceland, and several Arab nations.

As with other countries, the 200 nautical miles (370 km) exclusive economic zone (EEZ) off the coast of the United States gives its fishing industry special fishing rights. It covers 11.4 million square kilometres (4.38 million sq mi), which is the second largest zone in the world, exceeding the land area of the United States.

According to the FAO, in 2005, the United States harvested 4,888,621 tonnes of fish from wild fisheries, and another 471,958 tonnes from aquaculture. This made the United States the fifth leading producer of fish, after China, Peru, India, and Indonesia, with 3.8 percent of the world total.

Mining in the United States has been active since the beginning of colonial times, but became a major industry in the 19th century with a number of new mineral discoveries causing a series of mining rushes. In 2015, the value of coal, metals, and industrial minerals mined in the United States was US$109.6 billion. 158,000 workers were directly employed by the mining industry.

The mining industry has a number of impacts on communities, individuals and the environment. Mine safety incidents have been important parts of American occupational safety and health history. Mining has a number of environmental impacts. In the United States, issues like mountaintop removal, and acid mine drainage have widespread impacts on all parts of the environment. As of January 2020, the EPA lists 142 mines in the Superfund program.

In 2019, the country was the 4th world producer of gold; 5th largest world producer of copper; 5th worldwide producer of platinum; 10th worldwide producer of silver; 2nd largest world producer of rhenium; 2nd largest world producer of sulfur; 3rd largest world producer of phosphate; 3rd largest world producer of molybdenum; 4th largest world producer of lead; 4th largest world producer of zinc; 5th worldwide producer of vanadium; 9th largest world producer of iron ore; 9th largest world producer of potash; 12th largest world producer of cobalt; 13th largest world producer of titanium; world's largest producer of gypsum; 2nd largest world producer of kyanite; 2nd largest world producer of limestone; in addition to being the 2nd largest world producer of salt. It was the world's 10th largest producer of uranium in 2018.

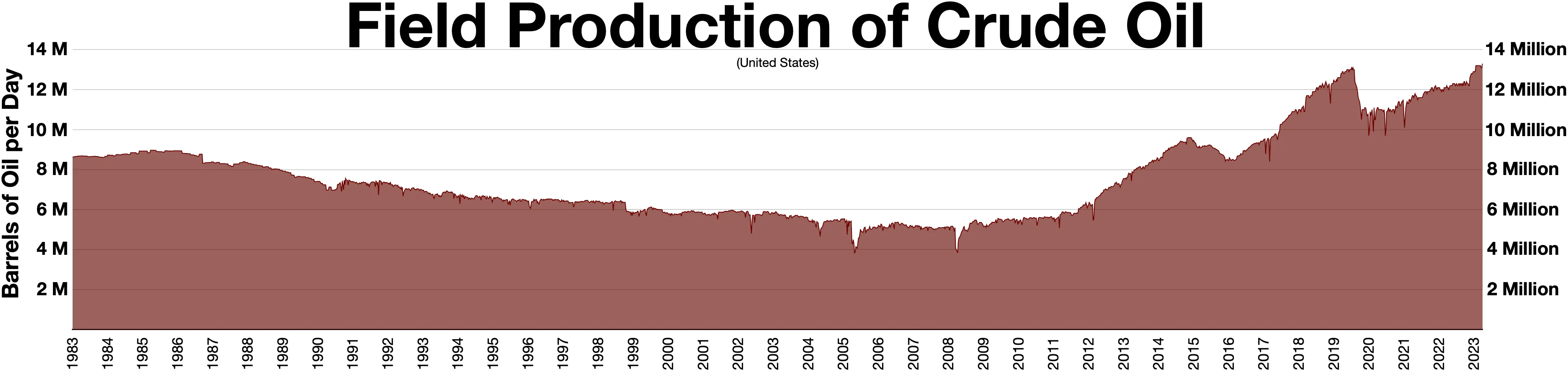
Crude oil production in barrels of oil a day (average for the month)

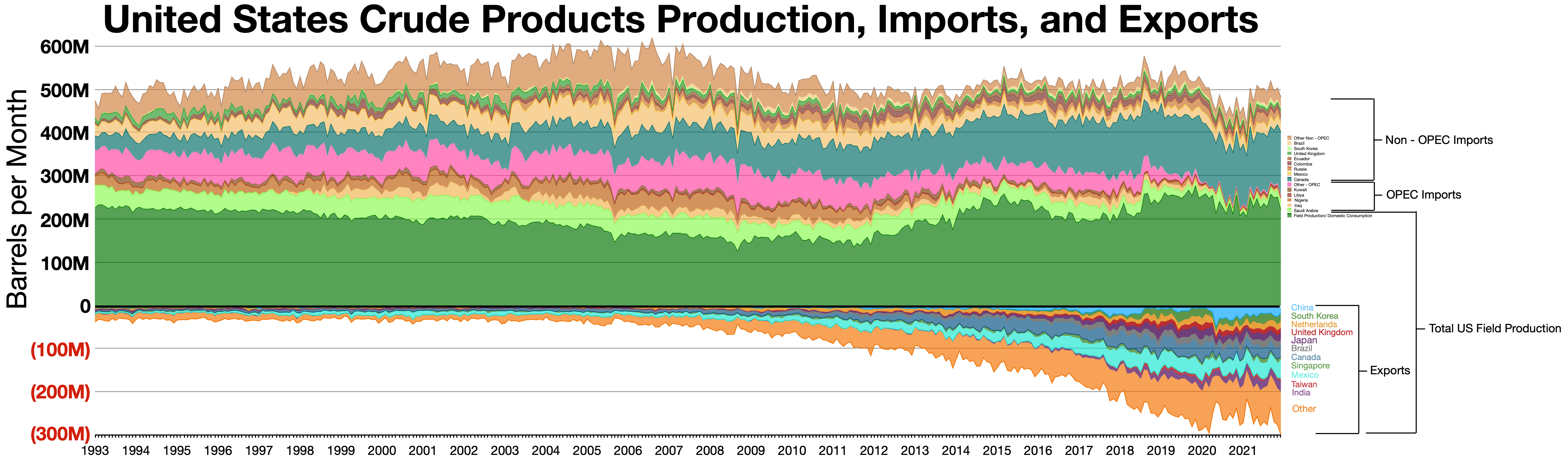
US oil production, imports, & exports

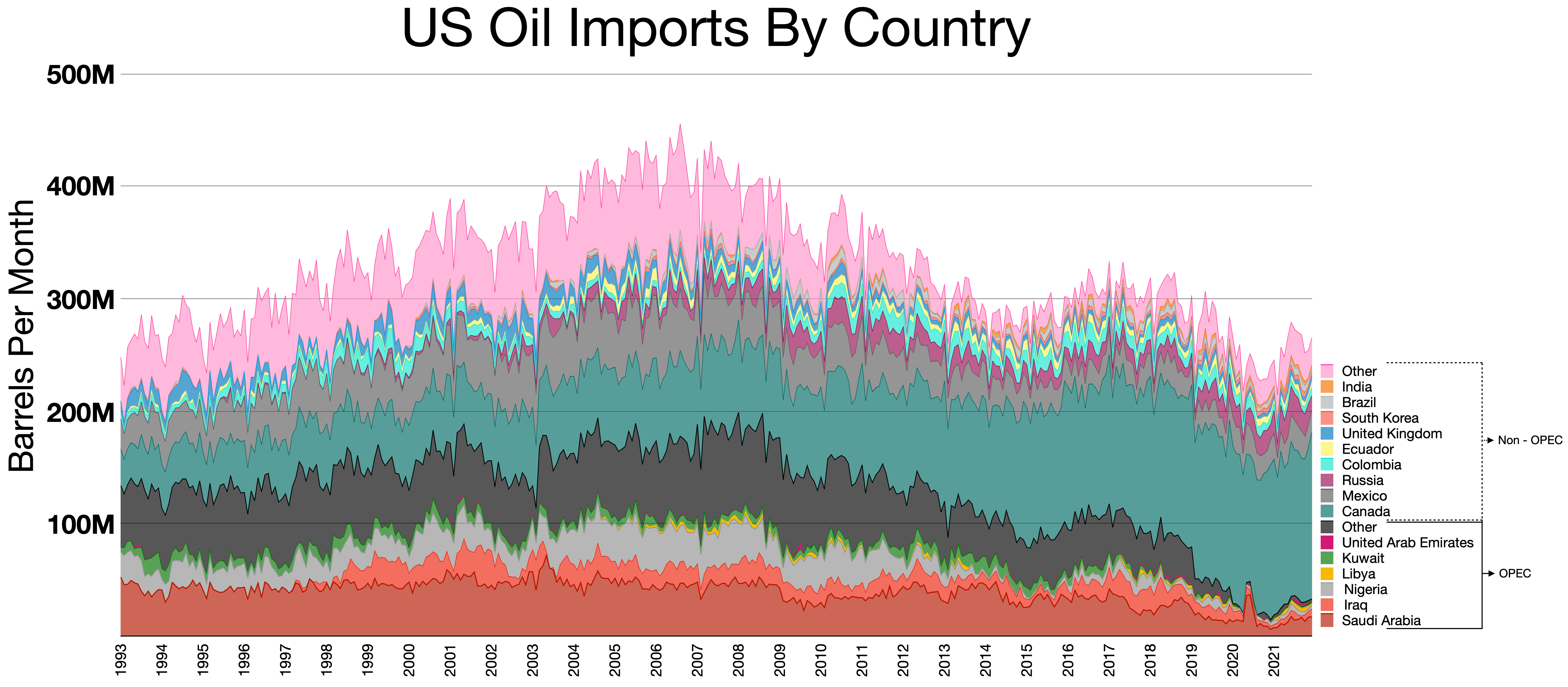
Oil product imports by country

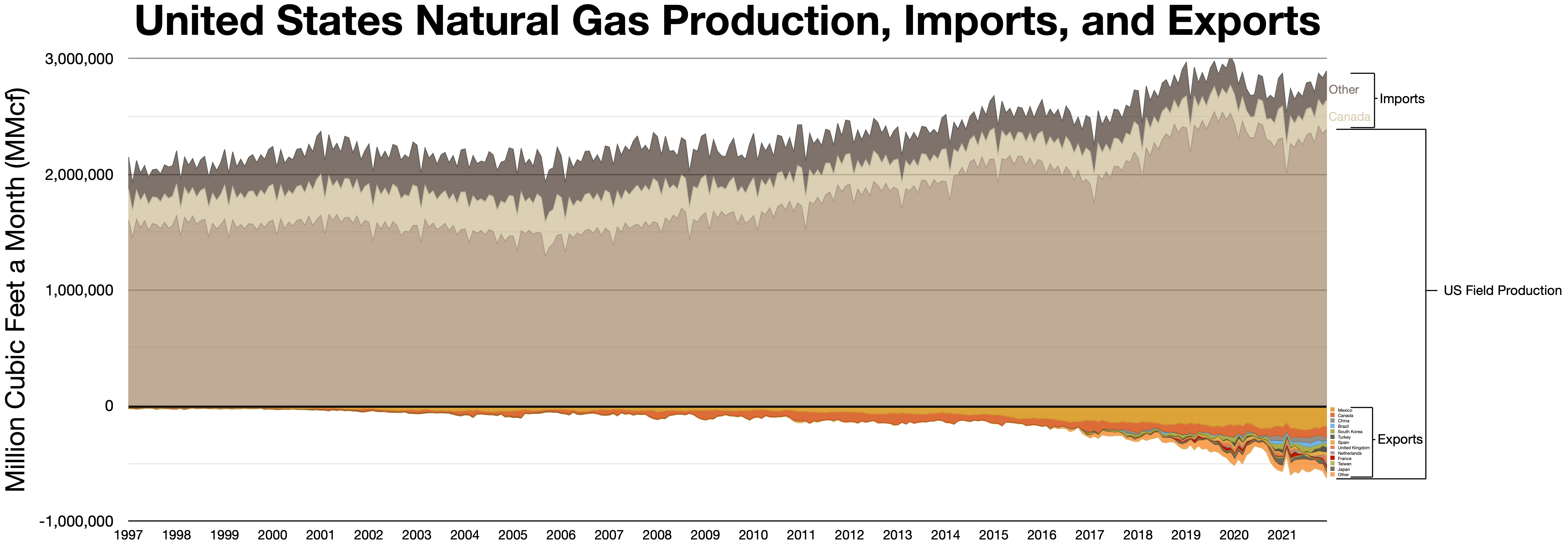
US natural gas production, imports, and exports

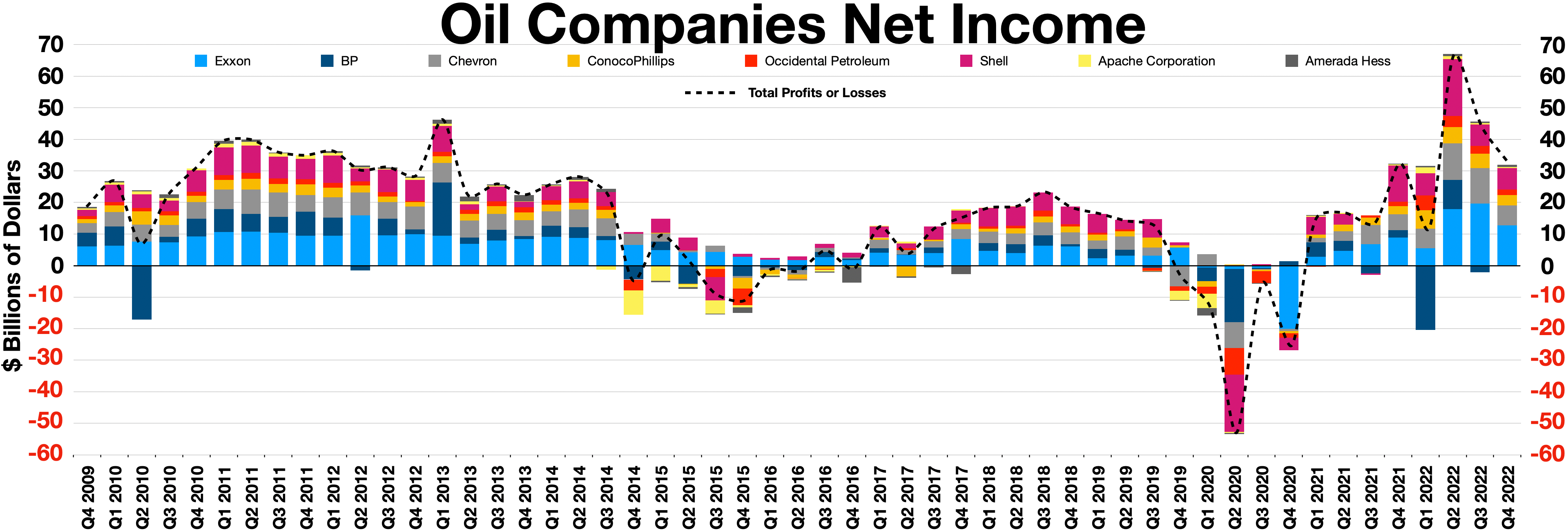
Top 8 oil companies quarterly net income or net loss

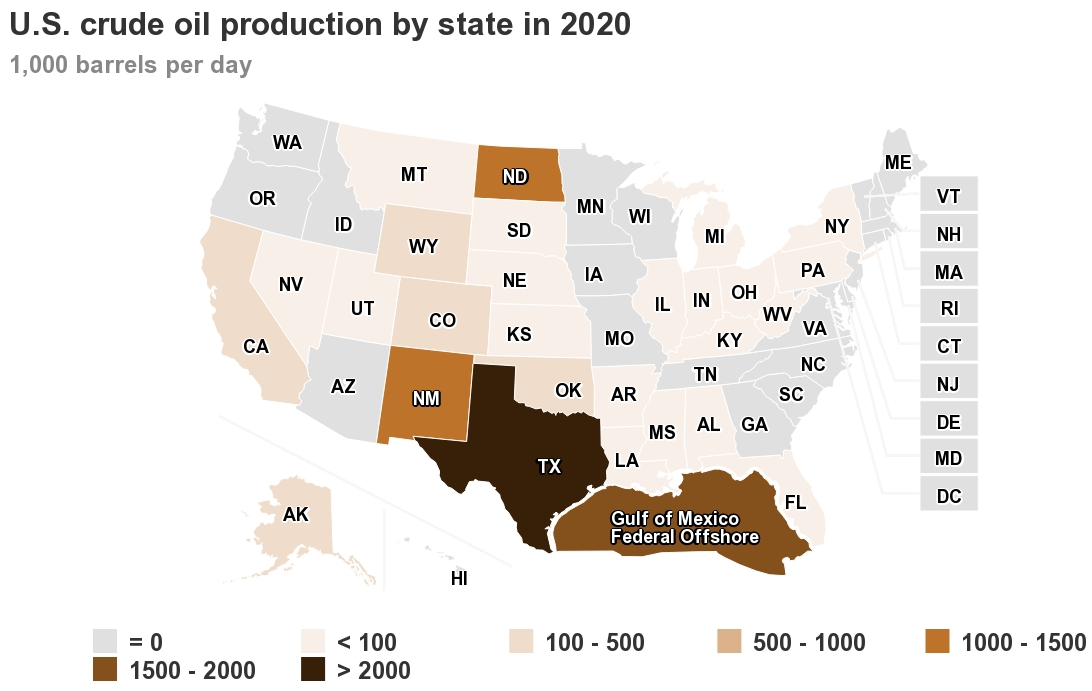
Oil production by state 2020

US energy consumption, by source, 1776–2024. Vertical axis is in quadrillion BTU.

The United States is the largest producer of petroleum in the world. Petroleum has been a major industry in the United States since the 1859 Pennsylvania oil rush around Titusville, Pennsylvania. Commonly characterized as "Big Oil", the industry includes exploration, production, refining, transportation, and marketing of oil and natural gas products. The leading crude oil-producing areas in the United States in 2023 were Texas, followed by the offshore federal zone of the Gulf of Mexico, then North Dakota and New Mexico.

The United States became the largest producer of crude oil of any nation in history in 2023. Natural gas production reached record highs. Employment in oil and gas extraction peaked at 267,000 in March 1982, and totaled 199,500 in March 2024.

Despite petroleum's many uses from its large scale production, it comes with issues surrounding the environment and human health. Oil spills are a source of pollution and there is heavy water usage for oil production. Use of petroleum products generates greenhouse gas emissions.

=== Secondary sectors ===
The United States is the world's second-largest manufacturer, with a 2013 industrial output of US$2.4 trillion. Its manufacturing output is greater than of Germany, France, India, and Brazil combined. Its main industries include financials, information technology, petroleum, steel, automobiles, construction machinery, aerospace, agricultural machinery, telecommunications, chemicals, electronics, food processing, consumer goods, lumber, mining and armaments.

The U.S. leads the world in airplane manufacturing, which represents a large portion of U.S. industrial output. American companies such as Boeing, Cessna (see: Textron), Lockheed Martin (see: Skunk Works), and General Dynamics produce a majority of the world's civilian and military aircraft in factories across the United States.

The manufacturing sector of the U.S. economy has experienced substantial job losses over the past several years. In January 2004, the number of such jobs stood at 14.3 million, down by 3.0 million jobs (17.5%) since July 2000 and about 5.2 million since the historical peak in 1979. Employment in manufacturing was its lowest since July 1950. The number of steel workers fell from 500,000 in 1980 to 224,000 in 2000.

Statistics released by the U.S. Census Bureau showed that, in 2008, the number of business 'deaths' began overtaking the number of business 'births' and that the trend continued at least through 2012.

The U.S. produces approximately 18% of the world's manufacturing output, a share that has declined as other nations developed competitive manufacturing industries. The job loss during this continual volume growth is the result of multiple factors including increased productivity, trade, and secular economic trends. In addition, growth in telecommunications, pharmaceuticals, aircraft, heavy machinery and other industries along with declines in low end, low skill industries such as clothing, toys, and other simple manufacturing have resulted in some U.S. jobs being more highly skilled and better paying. There has been much debate within the United States on whether the decline in manufacturing jobs are related to American unions, lower foreign wages, or both.

=== Tertiary sectors ===
The Interstate Highway System extends 46,876 miles (75,440 km).

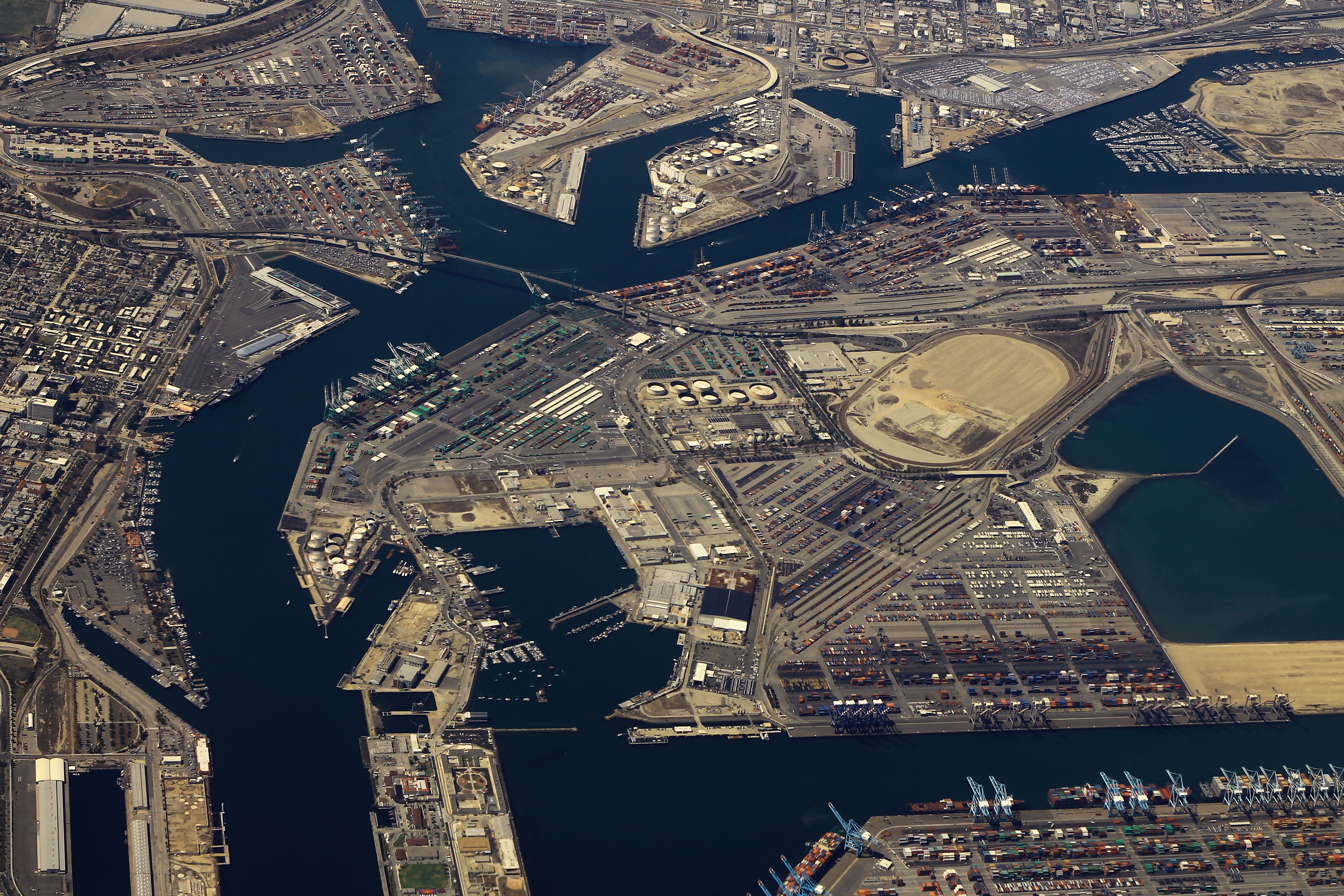
The Port of Long Beach, The largest ports in the United States

==== Transportation ====
===== Road =====
The U.S. economy is heavily dependent on road transport for moving people and goods. Personal transportation is dominated by automobiles, which operate on a network of four million miles (6.4 million km) of public roads, including one of the world's longest highway systems at 57,000 miles (91,700 km). The world's second-largest automobile market, the United States has the highest rate of per-capita vehicle ownership in the world, with 765 vehicles per 1,000 Americans. About 40% of personal vehicles are vans, SUVs, or light trucks.

===== Rail =====
Mass transit accounts for 9% of total U.S. work trips. Transport of goods by rail is extensive, though relatively low numbers of passengers (approximately 31 million annually) use intercity rail to travel, partially due to the low population density throughout much of the nation. However, ridership on Amtrak, the national intercity passenger rail system, grew by almost 37% between 2000 and 2010. Also, light rail development has increased in recent years. The state of California is currently constructing the nation's first high-speed rail system.

===== Airline =====
Top passenger airports by enplanements

Cargo airports by weight landed

The civil airline industry is entirely privately owned and has been largely deregulated since 1978, while most major airports are publicly owned. The three largest airlines in the world by passengers carried are U.S.-based; American Airlines is number one after its 2013 acquisition by U.S. Airways. Of the world's thirty busiest passenger airports, twelve are in the United States, including the busiest, Hartsfield–Jackson Atlanta International Airport.

==== Energy ====
Countries by natural gas proven reserves (2014). The U.S. holds the world's fourth largest natural gas reserves.

The US is the second-largest energy consumer in total use. The U.S. ranks seventh in energy consumption per capita after Canada and a number of other countries. The majority of this energy is derived from fossil fuels: in 2005, it was estimated that 40% of the nation's energy came from petroleum, 23% from coal, and 23% from natural gas. Nuclear power supplied 8.4% and renewable energy supplied 6.8%, which was mainly from hydroelectric dams although other renewables are included.

American dependence on oil imports grew from 24% in 1970 to 65% by the end of 2005. Transportation has the highest consumption rates, accounting for approximately 69% of the oil used in the United States in 2006, and 55% of oil use worldwide as documented in the Hirsch report.

In 2013, the United States imported 2.808 billion barrels of crude oil, compared to 3.377 billion barrels in 2010. While the U.S. is the largest importer of fuel, The Wall Street Journal reported in 2011 that the country was about to become a net fuel exporter for the first time in 62 years. The paper reported expectations that this would continue until 2020. In fact, petroleum was the major export from the country in 2011.

==== Telecommunications ====
The Internet was developed in the U.S. and the country hosts many of the world's largest hubs.

==== Tourism ====
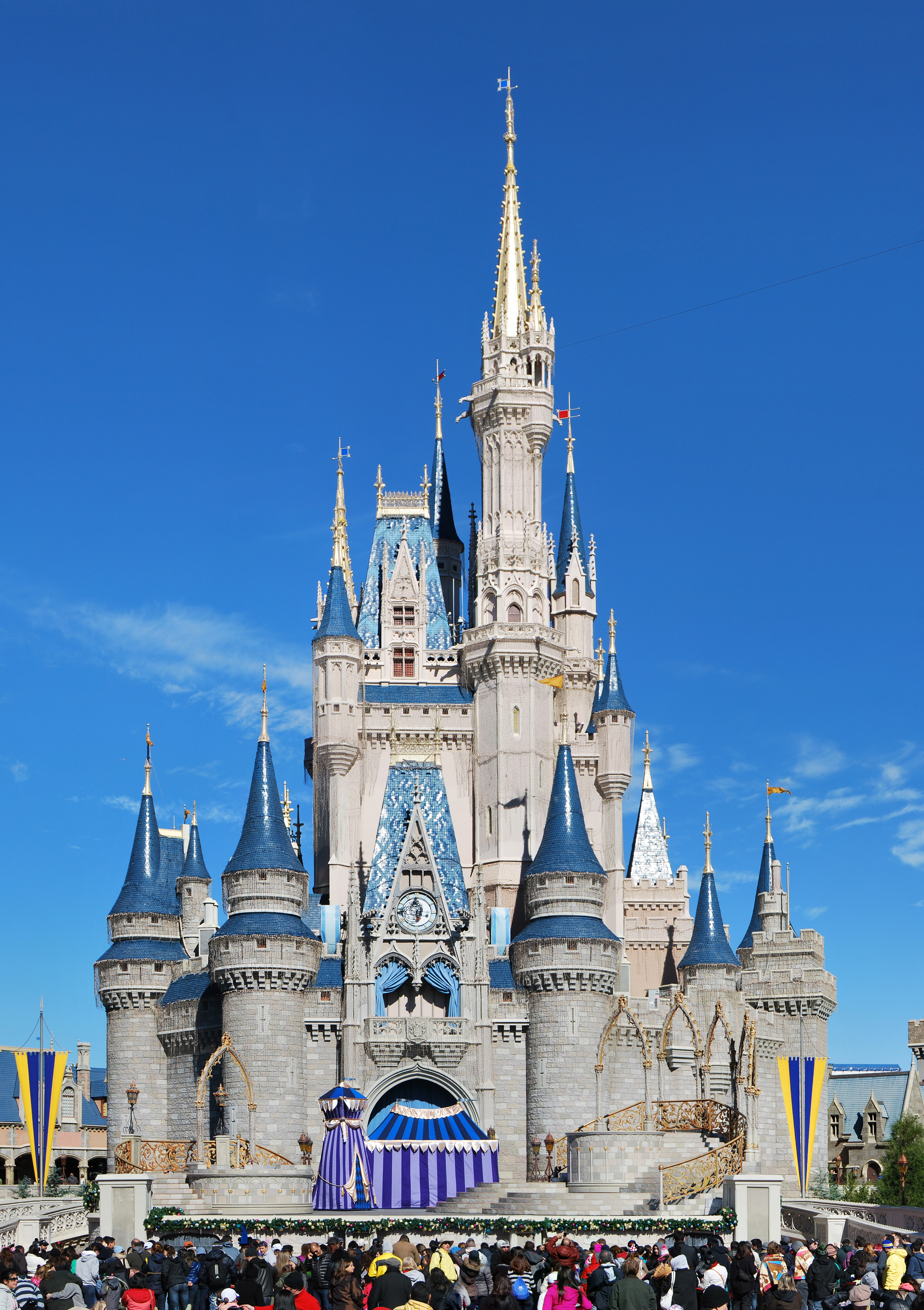
Walt Disney World's Magic Kingdom in Bay Lake, Florida is the most visited theme park in the world. In 2016, Orlando, Florida was the most visited destination in the United States, and continues to be one of the most visited destinations in the world.

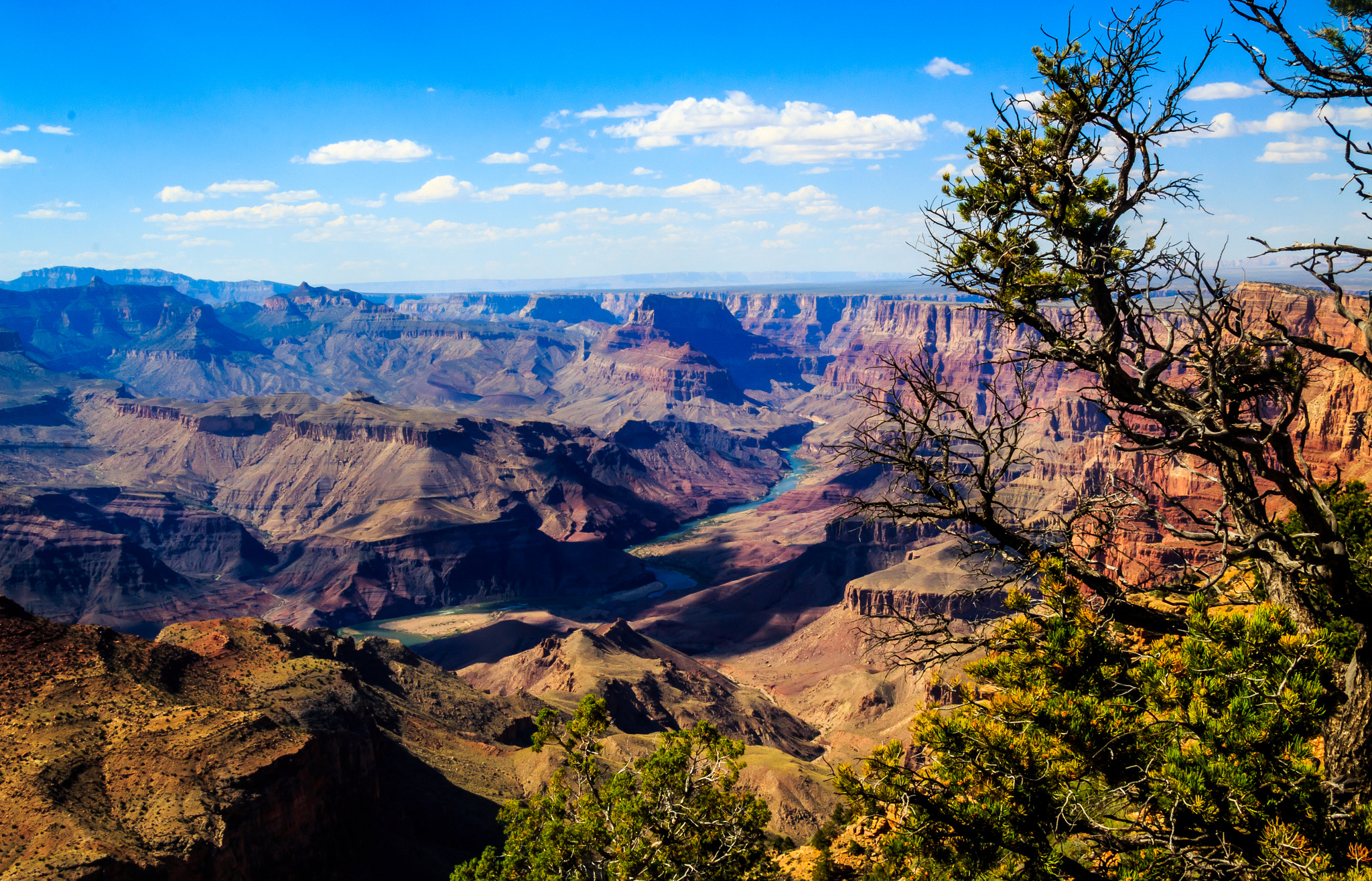
The Grand Canyon of Arizona attracts approximately 4.41 million visitors annually.

In the United States, tourism is a large industry that serves millions of international and domestic tourists yearly. Foreigners visit the U.S. to see natural wonders, cities, historic landmarks, and entertainment venues. Americans seek similar attractions, as well as recreation and vacation areas.

Tourism in the United States grew rapidly in the form of urban tourism during the late nineteenth and early twentieth centuries. By the 1850s, tourism in the United States was well established both as a cultural activity and as an industry. New York City, Los Angeles, Chicago, Boston, Philadelphia, Washington, D.C., and San Francisco, all major U.S. cities, have attracted numerous tourists since the 1890s. By 1915, city touring had marked significant shifts in the way Americans perceived, organized, and moved.

During the early 20th century, many more people started to travel, partly because of the spread of the automobile. Similarly air travel revolutionized travel during 1945–1969, contributing greatly to tourism in the United States. Purchases of travel and tourism-related goods and services by international visitors traveling in the United States totaled $10.9 billion during February 2013.

According to the U.S. Bureau of Economic Analysis, travel and tourism generated $840 billion in value added in 2023, equal to 3.03 percent of U.S. gross domestic product. Total tourism-related employment was 10.0 million jobs, consisting of 6.5 million direct tourism jobs and 3.6 million indirect tourism jobs. As of 2007, there are 2,462 registered National Historic Landmarks (NHL) recognized by the United States government. As of 2023, New York City is the most visited destination in the United States, followed by Miami, Los Angeles, Orlando, and San Francisco.

Tourists spend more money in the United States than in any other country, but the United States attracts only the third-highest number of tourists, after France and Spain. The discrepancy may be explained by longer stays in the US.

== International trade ==
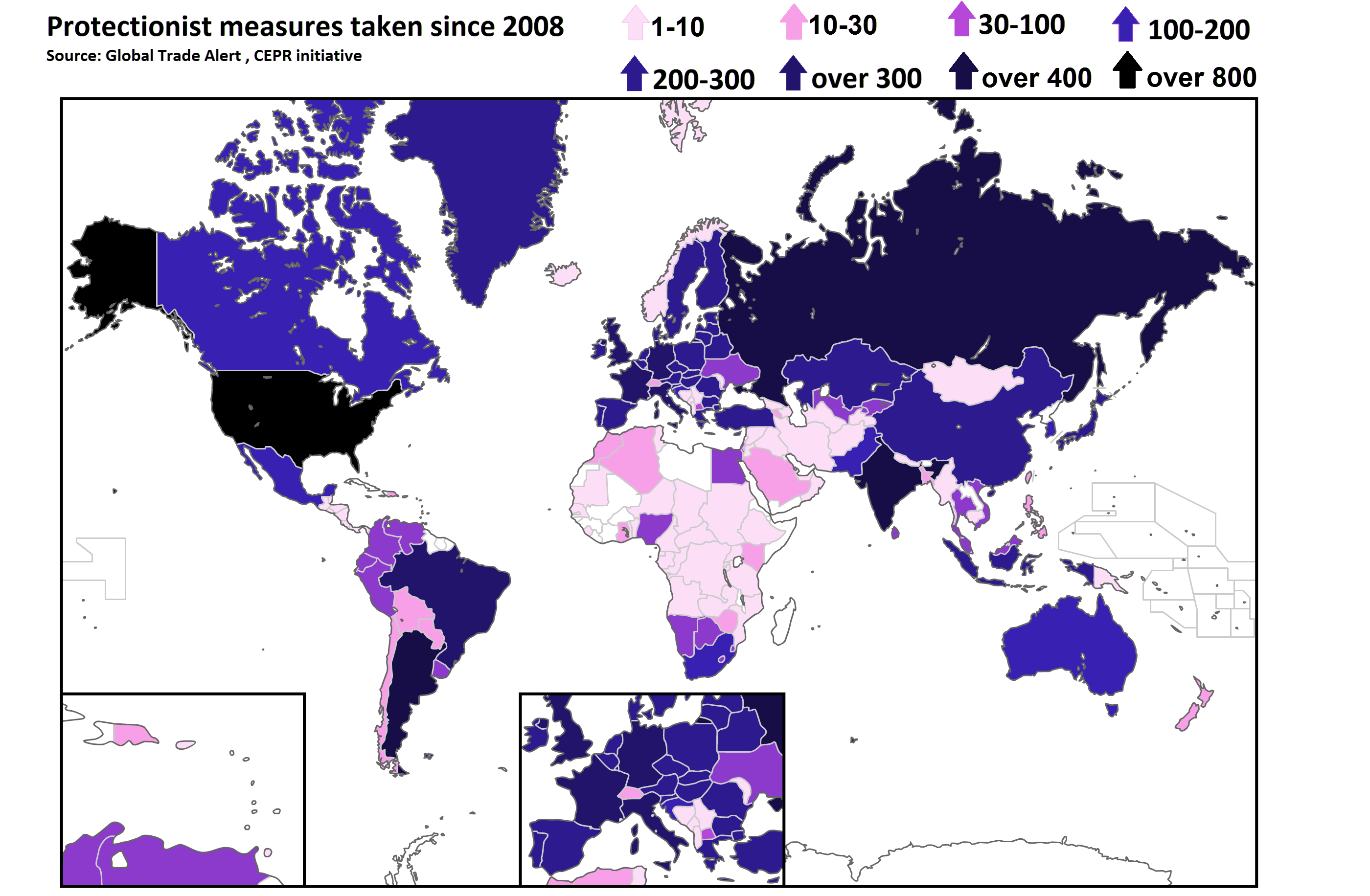
Protectionist measures since 2008 by country

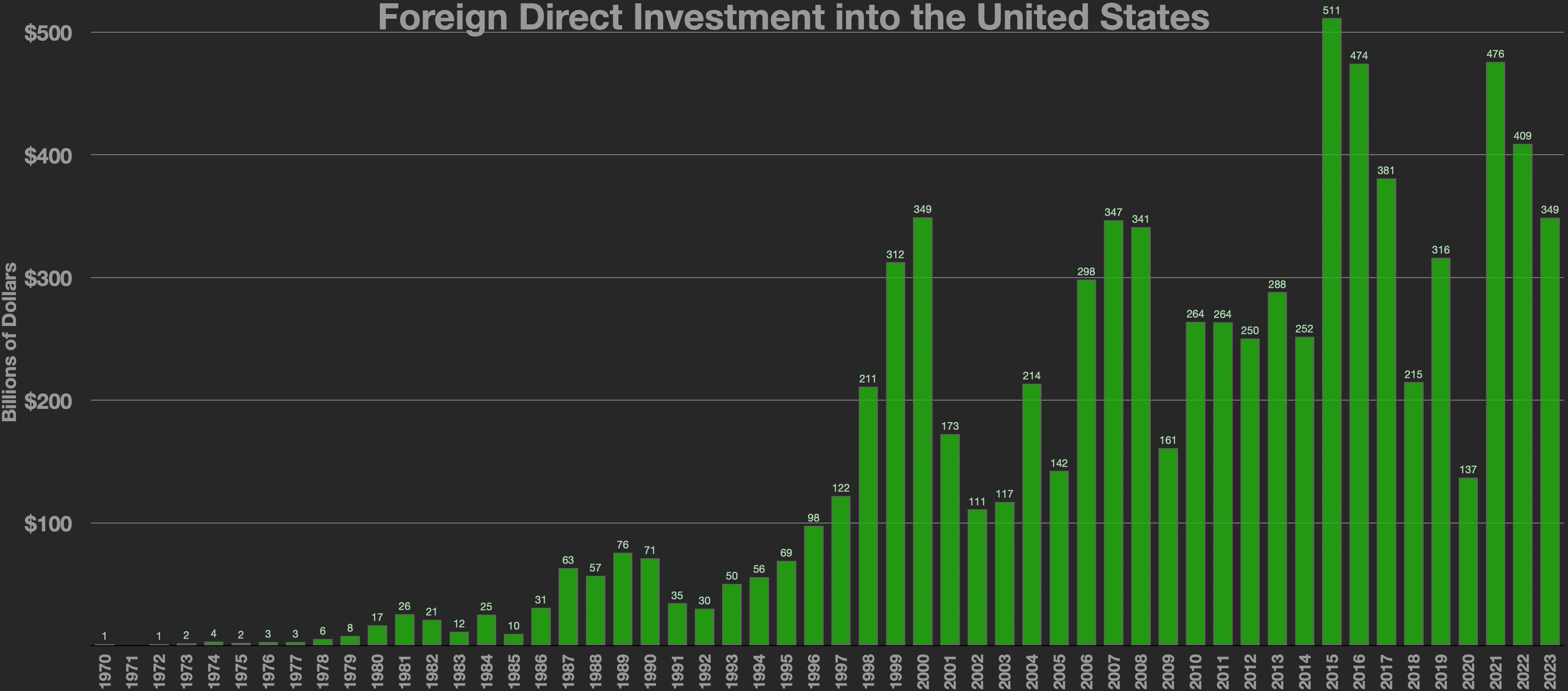
Foreign direct investment into the United States by year

The U.S. economy plays a significant role in global trade, being the second largest exporter, largest importer and largest services trader as of 2025. There is a large amount of U.S. dollars in circulation all around the planet; about 60% of funds used in international trade are U.S. dollars. The dollar is also used as the standard unit of currency in international markets for commodities such as gold and petroleum.

The North American Free Trade Agreement, or NAFTA, created one of the largest trade blocs in the world in 1994.

Since 1976, the U.S. has sustained merchandise trade deficits with other nations, and since 1982, current account deficits. The nation's long-standing surplus in its trade in services was maintained, however, and reached a record US$231 billion in 2013.

The U.S. trade deficit increased from $502 billion in 2016 to $552 billion in 2017, an increase of $50 billion or 10%. During 2017, total imports were $2.90 trillion, while exports were $2.35 trillion. The net deficit in goods was $807 billion, while the net surplus in services was $255 billion.

Americas ten largest trading partners are China, Canada, Mexico, Japan, Germany, South Korea, United Kingdom, France, India and Taiwan. The goods trade deficit with China rose from $347 billion in 2016 to $376 billion in 2017, an increase of $30 billion or 8%. In 2017, the U.S. had a goods trade deficit of $71 billion with Mexico and $17 billion with Canada.

According to the KOF index of globalization and the globalization index by A.T. Kearney/Foreign Policy Magazine, the U.S. has a relatively high degree of globalization. U.S. workers send a third of all remittances in the world.

Balance of trade 2014 (goods only)
	China	Euro area	Japan	Mexico	Pacific	Canada	Middle East	Latin America	Total by product
Computer	−151.9	3.4	−8.0	−11.0	−26.1	20.9	5.8	12.1	−155.0
Oil, gas, minerals	1.9	6.4	2.4	−20.8	1.1	−79.8	−45.1	−15.9	−149.7
Transportation	10.9	−30.9	−46.2	−59.5	−0.5	−6.1	17.1	8.8	−106.3
Apparel	−56.3	−4.9	0.6	−4.2	−6.3	2.5	−0.3	−1.1	−69.9
Electrical equipment	−35.9	−2.4	−4.0	−8.5	−3.3	10.0	1.8	2.0	−40.4
Misc. manufacturing	−35.3	4.9	2.7	−2.8	−1.4	5.8	−1.5	1.8	−25.8
Furniture	−18.3	−1.2	0.0	−1.6	−2.1	0.4	0.2	0.0	−22.6
Machinery	−19.9	−27.0	−18.8	3.9	7.6	18.1	4.5	9.1	−22.4
Primary metals	−3.1	3.1	−1.8	1.0	1.9	−8.9	−0.9	−10.4	−19.1
Fabricated metals	−17.9	−5.9	−3.5	2.8	−4.3	7.3	1.2	1.9	−18.5
Plastics	−15.7	−1.9	−2.0	5.7	−4.1	2.6	−0.1	0.5	−15.0
Textile	−12.3	−1.1	−0.3	2.8	−4.6	1.5	−0.9	0.2	−14.7
Beverages, tobacco	1.3	−9.9	0.6	−3.3	0.0	1.0	0.2	−0.6	−10.6
Nonmetallic minerals	−6.1	−1.9	−0.4	−1.2	0.1	1.9	−0.5	−0.8	−8.9
Paper	−2.7	1.2	1.1	4.3	1.2	−9.8	0.9	−1.9	−5.8
Chemical	−3.9	−39.5	−1.5	19.1	3.2	4.6	−2.4	15.8	−4.7
Food	0.7	−3.6	6.1	4.9	0.9	0.1	1.4	−1.1	9.5
Agriculture	17.8	6.2	7.3	−3.0	5.7	−0.8	2.8	−6.5	29.5
Petroleum	0.6	−1.2	0.1	16.6	−2.0	−0.1	0.6	18.3	32.9
Total by country/area	−346.1	−106.1	−65.6	−54.9	−33.0	−29.0	−15.1	32.3	

== Financial position ==
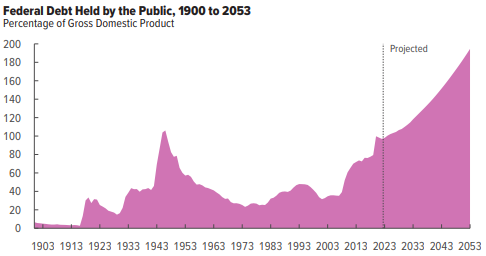
The amount of U.S. public debt, measured as a percentage of GDP, held by the public since 1900

The U.S. public debt was $909 billion in 1980, an amount equal to 33% of America's gross domestic product (GDP); by 1990, that number had more than tripled to $3.2 trillion – 56% of GDP. In 2001 the national debt was $5.7 trillion; however, the debt-to-GDP ratio remained at 1990 levels. Debt levels rose quickly in the following decade, and on January 28, 2010, the U.S. debt ceiling was raised to $14.3 trillion. Based on the 2010 United States federal budget, total national debt will grow to nearly 100% of GDP, versus a level of approximately 80% in early 2009. The White House estimates that the government's tab for servicing the debt will exceed $700 billion a year in 2019, up from $202 billion in 2009.

U.S. household and non-profit net worth exceeded $100 trillion for the first time in Q1 2018; it has been setting records since Q4 2012. The U.S. federal government or "national debt" was $21.1 trillion in May 2018, just over 100% GDP. Using a subset of the national debt called "debt held by the public", U.S. debt was approximately 77% GDP in 2017. By this measure, the U.S. ranked 43rd highest among 2017 nations. Debt held by the public rose considerably as a result of the Great Recession and its aftermath. It is expected to continue rising as the country ages towards 100% GDP by 2028. In February 2024, the total federal government debt grew to $34.4 trillion after having grown by approximately $1 trillion in both of two separate 100-day periods since the previous June.

The U.S. Treasury statistics indicate that, at the end of 2006, non-US citizens and institutions held 44% of federal debt held by the public. As of 2014, China, holding $1.26 trillion in treasury bonds, is the largest foreign financier of the U.S. public debt.

The overall financial position of the United States as of 2014 includes $269.6 trillion of assets owned by households, businesses, and governments within its borders, representing more than 15.7 times the annual gross domestic product of the United States. Debts owed during this same period amounted to $145.8 trillion, about 8.5 times the annual gross domestic product.

Since 2010, the U.S. Treasury has been obtaining negative real interest rates on government debt. Such low rates, outpaced by the inflation rate, occur when the market believes that there are no alternatives with sufficiently low risk, or when popular institutional investments such as insurance companies, pensions, or bond, money market, and balanced mutual funds are required or choose to invest sufficiently large sums in Treasury securities to hedge against risk. American economist Lawrence Summers argues that at such low rates, government debt borrowing saves taxpayer money, and improves creditworthiness.

In the late 1940s through the early 1970s, the US and UK both reduced their debt burden by about 30% to 40% of GDP per decade by taking advantage of negative real interest rates, but there is no guarantee that government debt rates will continue to stay so low. In January 2012, the U.S. Treasury Borrowing Advisory Committee of the Securities Industry and Financial Markets Association unanimously recommended that government debt be allowed to auction even lower, at negative absolute interest rates.

The consumer confidence index fell to 88.7 in November 2025, which was a significant drop from the previous month. The decrease has been attributed to concerns over employment stability, rising inflation, financial security, trade tensions, and political uncertainty.

== Currency and central bank ==
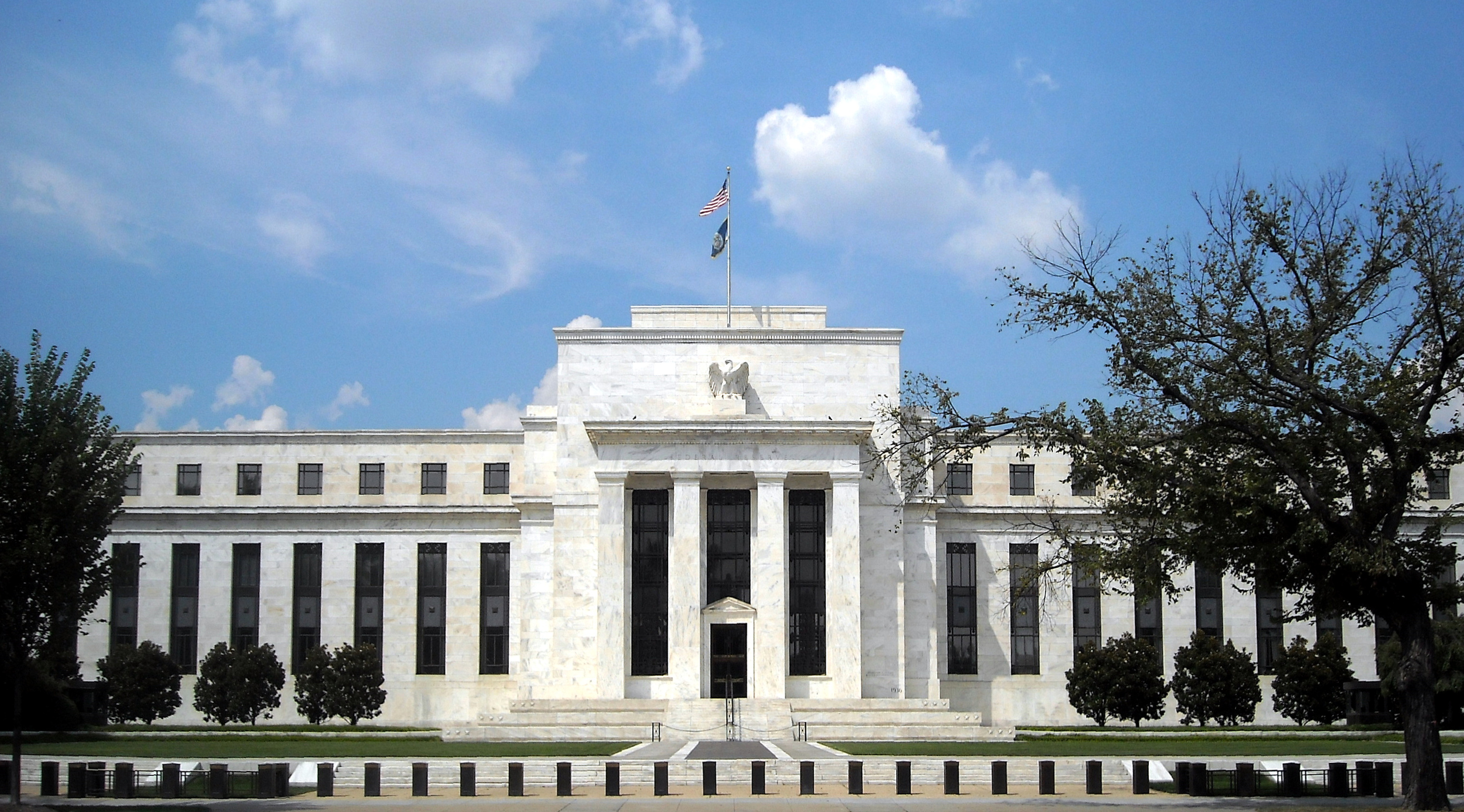
The Federal Reserve is the central banking system of the United States.

The United States dollar is the unit of currency of the United States. The U.S. dollar is the currency most used in international transactions. Several countries use it as their official currency, and in many others it is the de facto currency.

The federal government attempts to use both monetary policy (control of the money supply through mechanisms such as changes in interest rates) and fiscal policy (taxes and spending) to maintain low inflation, high economic growth, and low unemployment. An independent central bank, known as the Federal Reserve, was formed in 1913 to provide a stable currency and monetary policy. The U.S. dollar has been regarded as one of the more stable currencies in the world and many nations back their own currency with U.S. dollar reserves.

The U.S. dollar has maintained its position as the world's primary reserve currency, although it is gradually being challenged in that role. Almost two thirds of currency reserves held around the world are held in U.S. dollars, compared to around 25% for the next most popular currency, the euro. Rising U.S. national debt and quantitative easing has caused some to predict that the U.S. dollar will lose its status as the world's reserve currency; however, these predictions have not yet come to fruition.

== Climate change ==
At least 72% of Chinese, American and European respondents to a 2020−2021 European Investment Bank climate survey stated that climate change had an impact on everyday life.

The Fifth National Climate Assessment states that climate change impacts communities over all the territory of the United States. The impacts differ from state to state. The human and economic toll is high. Scientists now can say with relatively high confidence how much climate change impacted a specific meteorological event. The impacts mentioned in the report include, increase in frequency and magnitude of heat waves, droughts, floods, hurricanes and more.

An article in Science predicts that the Southern states, such as Texas, Florida, and the Deep South will be economically affected by climate change more severely than northern states (some of which would even gain benefits), but that economic impacts of climate change would likely exacerbate preexisting economic inequality in the country. In September 2020, a subcommittee of the Commodity Futures Trading Commission issued a report that concluded that climate change poses systemic risks to the U.S. financial system, while the Financial Stability Oversight Council released a report in October 2021 that identified climate change as an emerging and increasing threat to the stability of the U.S. financial system.

A 2021 survey of 1,422 members of the American Economic Association found that 86 percent of professional economists generally agreed with the statement: "Climate change poses a major risk to the US economy." In September 2023, the U.S. Treasury Department issued a report in consultation with the Financial Literacy and Education Commission found that 13% of Americans experienced financial hardship in 2022 due to the effects of climate change after $176 billion in weather disasters. In April 2024, Consumer Reports announced the release of a report commissioned from ICF International that estimated that climate change could cost Americans born in 2024 nearly $500,000 over their lifetimes.

A 2026 study published in Nature estimated that, from 1990 through 2020, carbon dioxide emissions in the US caused $10.2 trillion in cumulative damages by 2020, with about 30% occurring within the US itself. The researchers said that future damages from past emissions are at least an order of magnitude larger than historical damages from the same emissions.

== Corruption ==
In 2019, the United States was ranked 23rd on the Transparency International Corruption Perceptions Index with a score of 69 out of 100. This is a decrease from its score in 2018 which was 71 out of 100.

== Law and government ==
The United States ranked 4th in the ease of doing business index in 2012, 18th in the Economic Freedom of the World index by the Fraser Institute in 2012, 10th in the Index of Economic Freedom by The Wall Street Journal and The Heritage Foundation in 2012, 15th in the 2014 Global Enabling Trade Report, and 3rd on the Global Competitiveness Report.

According to the 2014 Index of Economic Freedom, released by The Wall Street Journal and The Heritage Foundation, the U.S. has dropped out of the top ten most economically free countries. The U.S. has been on a steady seven-year economic freedom decline and is the only country to do so. The index measures each nation's commitment to free enterprise on a scale of 0 to 100. Countries losing economic freedom and receiving low index scores are at risk of economic stagnation, high unemployment rates, and diminishing social conditions. The 2014 Index of Economic Freedom gave the United States a score of 75.5 and is listed as the twelfth-freest economy in world. It dropped two rankings and its score is half a point lower than in 2013.

Economist Alan Blinder criticizes democratic government regulation of the U.S. economy as too short-sighted (targeting either the next election or the next news cycle rather than making difficult choices that favor long-term benefits despite short-term pain) and favoring policies that sound good and avoiding those that sound bad, regardless of merit when examined rigorously by economists.

=== Regulations ===
Number of countries having a banking crisis in each year since 1800. This is based on This Time is Different: Eight Centuries of Financial Folly which covers only seventy countries. The general upward trend might be attributed to many factors. One of these is a gradual increase in the percent of people who receive money for their labor. The dramatic feature of this graph is the virtual absence of banking crises during the period of the Bretton Woods agreement, 1945 to 1971. This analysis is similar to Figure 10.1 in Reinhart and Rogoff (2009). For more details see the help file for "bankingCrises" in the Ecdat package available from the Comprehensive R Archive Network (CRAN).

The U.S. federal government regulates private enterprise in numerous ways. Regulation falls into two general categories.

Some efforts seek, either directly or indirectly, to control prices. Traditionally, the government has sought to create state-regulated monopolies such as electric utilities while allowing prices in the level that would ensure them normal profits. At times, the government has extended economic control to other kinds of industries as well. In the years following the Great Depression, it devised a complex system to stabilize prices for agricultural goods, which tend to fluctuate wildly in response to rapidly changing supply and demand. A number of other industries—trucking and, later, airlines—successfully sought regulation themselves to limit what they considered as harmful price-cutting, a process called regulatory capture.

Another form of economic regulation, antitrust law, seeks to strengthen market forces so that direct regulation is unnecessary. The government—and, sometimes, private parties—have used antitrust law to prohibit practices or mergers that would unduly limit competition.

Bank regulation in the United States is highly fragmented compared to other G10 countries where most countries have only one bank regulator. In the U.S., banking is regulated at both the federal and state level. The U.S. also has one of the most highly regulated banking environments in the world; however, many of the regulations are not soundness related, but are instead focused on privacy, disclosure, fraud prevention, anti-money laundering, anti-terrorism, anti-usury lending, and promoting lending to lower-income segments.

Since the 1970s, government has also exercised control over private companies to achieve social goals, such as improving the public's health and safety or maintaining a healthy environment. For example, the Occupational Safety and Health Administration provides and enforces standards for workplace safety, and the United States Environmental Protection Agency provides standards and regulations to maintain air, water, and land resources. The U.S. Food and Drug Administration regulates what drugs may reach the market, and also provides standards of disclosure for food products.

American attitudes about regulation changed substantially during the final three decades of the 20th century. Beginning in the 1970s, policy makers grew increasingly convinced that economic regulation protected companies at the expense of consumers in industries such as airlines and trucking. At the same time, technological changes spawned new competitors in some industries, such as telecommunications, that once were considered natural monopolies. Both developments led to a succession of laws easing regulation.

While leaders of America's two most influential political parties generally favored economic deregulation during the 1970s, 1980s, and 1990s, there was less agreement concerning regulations designed to achieve social goals. Social regulation had assumed growing importance in the years following the Depression and World War II, and again in the 1960s and 1970s. During the 1980s, the government relaxed labor, consumer and environmental rules based on the idea that such regulation interfered with free enterprise, increased the costs of doing business, and thus contributed to inflation. The response to such changes is mixed; many Americans continued to voice concerns about specific events or trends, prompting the government to issue new regulations in some areas, including environmental protection.

Where legislative channels have been unresponsive, some citizens have turned to the courts to address social issues more quickly. For instance, in the 1990s, individuals, and eventually the government itself, sued tobacco companies over the health risks of cigarette smoking. The 1998 Tobacco Master Settlement Agreement provided states with long-term payments to cover medical costs to treat smoking-related illnesses.

Between 2000 and 2008, economic regulation in the United States saw the most rapid expansion since the early 1970s. The number of new pages in the Federal Registry, a proxy for economic regulation, rose from 64,438 new pages in 2001 to 78,090 in new pages in 2007, a record amount of regulation. Economically significant regulations, defined as regulations which cost more than $100 million a year, increased by 70%. Spending on regulation increased by 62% from $26.4 billion to $42.7 billion.

=== Taxation ===
Chart comparing effective total (federal and state and local) tax rates in the United States, of the richest Americans and those in the bottom 50% of earners

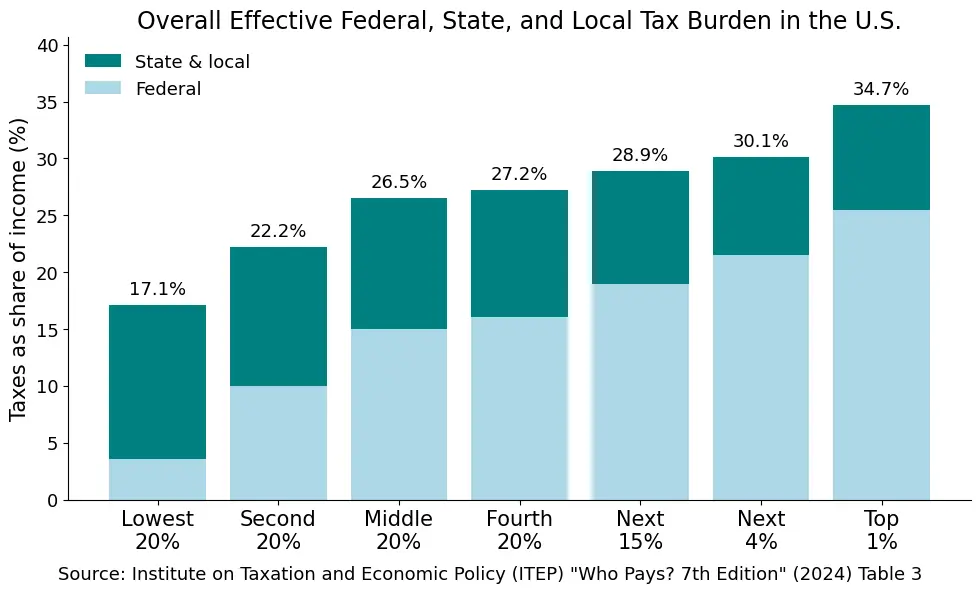
Overall tax burden in the US in 2024

Taxation in the United States is a complex system which may involve payment to at least four different levels of government and many methods of taxation. Taxes are levied by the federal government, by the state governments, and often by local governments, which may include counties, municipalities, township, school districts, and other special-purpose districts, which include fire, utility, and transit districts.

Forms of taxation include taxes on income, property, sales, imports, payroll, estates and gifts, as well as various fees. When taxation by all government levels taken into consideration, the total taxation as percentage of GDP was approximately a quarter of GDP in 2011. Share of black market in the U.S. economy is very low compared to other countries.

Although a federal wealth tax is prohibited by the United States Constitution unless the receipts are distributed to the States by their populations, state and local government property tax amount to a wealth tax on real estate, and because capital gains are taxed on nominal instead of inflation-adjusted profits, the capital gains tax amounts to a wealth tax on the inflation rate.

U.S. taxation is generally progressive, especially at the federal level, and is among the most progressive in the developed world. There is debate over whether taxes should be more or less progressive.

According to the Tax Justice Network in 2022, the US fuels more global financial secrecy than Switzerland, Cayman and Bermuda combined.

=== Expenditure ===
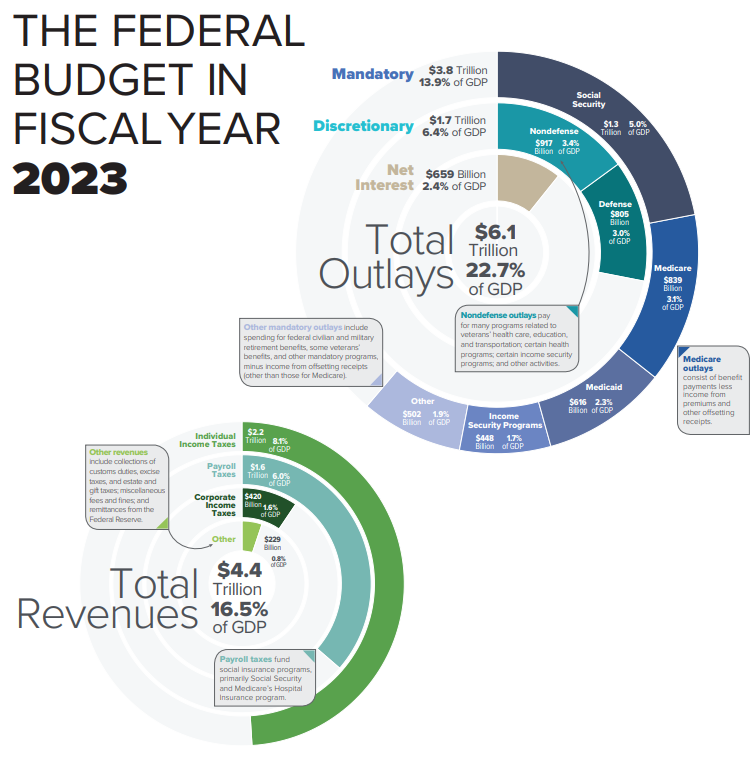
CBO: U.S. Federal spending and revenue components for fiscal year 2023. Major expenditure categories are healthcare, Social Security, and defense; income and payroll taxes are the primary revenue sources.

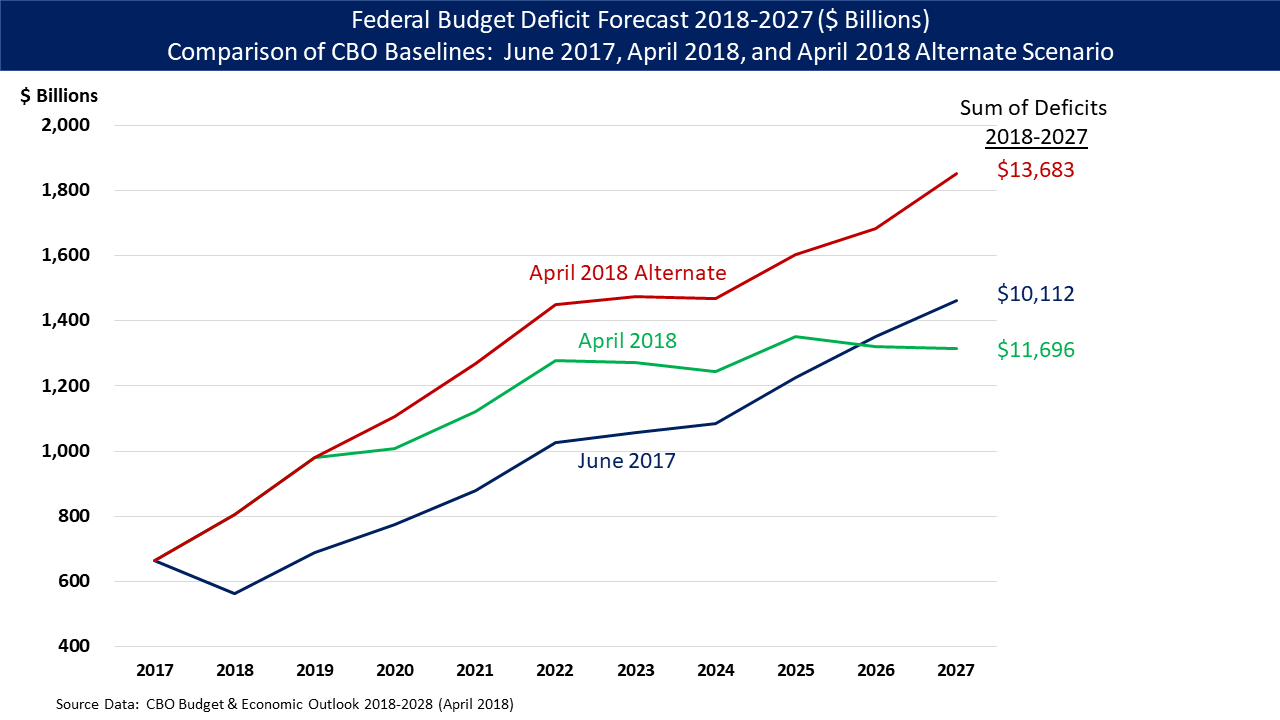
Congressional Budget Office (CBO) baseline scenario comparisons: June 2017 (essentially the deficit trajectory that President Trump inherited from President Obama), April 2018 (which reflects Trump's tax cuts and spending bills), and April 2018 alternate scenario (which assumes extension of the Trump tax cuts, among other current policy extensions).

The United States public-sector spending amounts to about 38% of GDP (federal is around 21%, state and local the remainder). Each level of government provides many direct services. The federal government, for example, is responsible for national defense, research that often leads to the development of new products, conducts space exploration, and runs numerous programs designed to help workers develop workplace skills and find jobs (including higher education). Government spending has a significant effect on local and regional economies, and on the overall pace of economic activity.

State governments, meanwhile, are responsible for the construction and maintenance of most highways. State, county, or city governments play the leading role in financing and operating public schools. Local governments are primarily responsible for police and fire protection. In 2016, U.S. state and local governments owed $3 trillion and have another $5 trillion in unfunded liabilities.

The welfare system in the United States began in the 1930s, during the Great Depression, with the passage of the New Deal. The welfare system was later expanded in the 1960s through Great Society legislation, which included Medicare, Medicaid, the Older Americans Act and federal education funding.

Overall, federal, state, and local spending accounted for almost 28% of gross domestic product in 1998.

=== Federal budget and debt ===
During FY2017, the federal government spent $3.98 trillion on a budget or cash basis, up $128 billion or 3.3% vs. FY2016 spending of $3.85 trillion. Major categories of FY 2017 spending included: Healthcare such as Medicare and Medicaid ($1,077B or 27% of spending), Social Security ($939B or 24%), non-defense discretionary spending used to run federal Departments and Agencies ($610B or 15%), Defense Department ($590B or 15%), and interest ($263B or 7%).

During FY2017, the federal government collected approximately $3.32 trillion in tax revenue, up $48 billion or 1.5% versus FY2016. Primary receipt categories included individual income taxes ($1,587 billion or 48% of total receipts), Social Security/Social Insurance taxes ($1,162 billion or 35%), and corporate taxes ($297 billion or 9%). Other revenue types included excise, estate and gift taxes. FY 2017 revenues were 17.3% of gross domestic product (GDP), versus 17.7% in FY 2016. Tax revenues averaged approximately 17.4% GDP over the 1980–2017 period.

The federal budget deficit (i.e., expenses greater than revenues) was $665 billion in FY2017, versus $585 billion in 2016, an increase of $80 billion or 14%. The budget deficit was 3.5% GDP in 2017, versus 3.2% GDP in 2016. The budget deficit is forecast to rise to $804 billion in FY 2018, due significantly to the Tax Cuts and Jobs Act and other spending bills. An aging country and healthcare inflation are other drivers of deficits and debt over the long-run.

Debt held by the public, a measure of national debt, was approximately $14.7 trillion or 77% of GDP in 2017, ranked the 43rd highest out of 207 countries. This debt, as a percent of GDP, is roughly equivalent to those of many western European nations.

== Defense industry ==
The U.S. defense industry is the world's largest arms industry, valued at over $354 billion in 2026, driven by high-tech investments, geopolitical tensions and modernization efforts. Dominated by major firms like Lockheed Martin, RTX Corporation and Northrop Grumman, the sector is shifting toward autonomous systems, artificial intelligence and software-defined platforms. Key challenges include supply chain constraints, skilled labor shortages and rising regulatory compliance costs.

== Business culture ==
A central feature of the U.S. economy is the economic freedom afforded to the private sector by allowing the private sector to make the majority of economic decisions in determining the direction and scale of what the U.S. economy produces. This is enhanced by relatively low levels of regulation and government involvement, as well as a court system that generally protects property rights and enforces contracts. As of 2025 the United States is home to 36.2 million small businesses, forty percent of the world's millionaires, thirty percent of the world's billionaires, and 138 of the world's 500 largest companies.

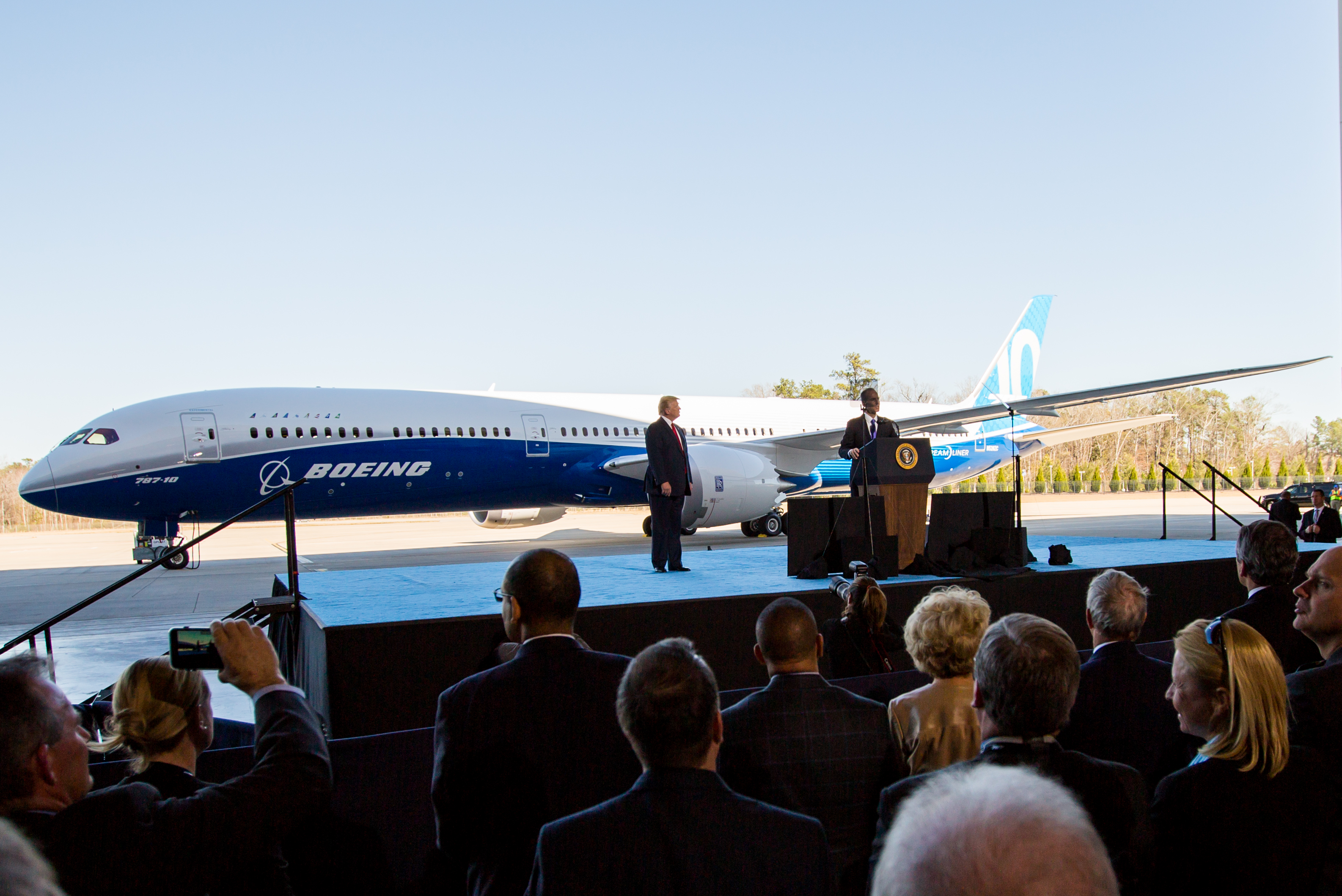
Boeing CEO Dennis Muilenburg at the 787-10 Dreamliner rollout ceremony

From its emergence as an independent nation, the United States has encouraged science and innovation. In the early 20th century, the research developed through informal cooperation between U.S. industry and academia grew rapidly and by the late 1930s exceeded the size of that taking place in Britain (although the quality of U.S. research was not yet on par with British and German research at the time). After World War II, federal spending on defense R&D and antitrust policy played a significant role in U.S. innovation.

The United States is rich in mineral resources and fertile farm soil, and it is fortunate to have a moderate climate. It also has extensive coastlines on both the Atlantic and Pacific Oceans, as well as on the Gulf of Mexico. Rivers flow from far within the continent and the Great Lakes (the five large inland lakes along the Canadian border) provide additional shipping access. These extensive waterways have helped shape the country's economic growth over the years and helped bind America's fifty individual states together in a single economic unit.

The number of workers and, more importantly, their productivity help determine the health of the U.S. economy. Consumer spending in the U.S. rose to about 62% of GDP in 1960, where it stayed until about 1981, and has since risen to 71% in 2013. Throughout its history, the United States has experienced steady growth in the labor force, a phenomenon that is both cause and effect of almost constant economic expansion. Until shortly after World War I, most workers were immigrants from Europe, their immediate descendants, or African Americans who were mostly slaves taken from Africa, or their descendants.

== Demographic shift ==
Beginning in the late 20th century, many Latin Americans immigrated, followed by large numbers of Asians after the removal of nation-origin based immigration quotas. The promise of high wages brings many highly skilled workers from around the world to the United States, as well as millions of undocumented immigrants seeking work in the informal economy. More than 13 million people officially entered the United States during the 1990s alone.

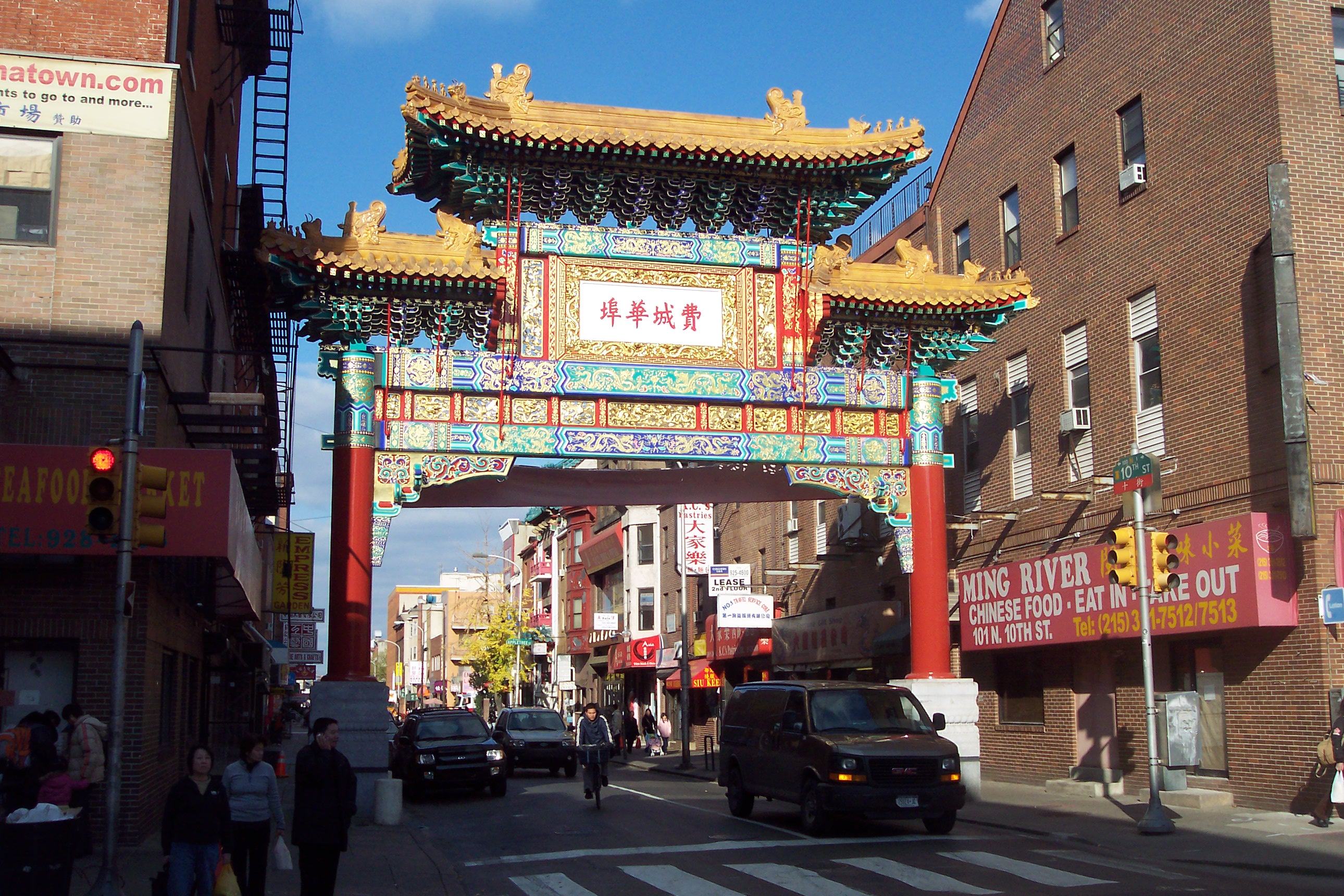
Restaurants and shops in Chinatown, Philadelphia

Labor mobility has also been important to the capacity of the American economy to adapt to changing conditions. When labor markets on the East Coast received a major influx of immigrants, many workers moved inland, often to farmland waiting to be tilled. Similarly, economic opportunities in industrial, northern cities attracted Black Americans from southern farms in the first half of the 20th century, in what was known as the Great Migration.

In the United States, the corporation has emerged as an association of owners, known as stockholders, who form a business enterprise governed by a complex set of rules and customs. Brought on by the process of mass production, corporations, such as General Electric, have been instrumental in shaping the United States. Today in the era of globalization, American investors and corporations have influence all over the world. The American government is also included among the major investors in the American economy. Government investments have been directed towards public works of scale (such as from the Hoover Dam), military-industrial contracts, and the financial industry.

=== Aging ===
The U.S. population is aging, which has significant economic implications for GDP growth, productivity, innovation, inequality, and national debt, according to several studies. The average worker in 2019 was aged 42, vs. 38 in 2000. By 2030, about 59% of adults over 16 will be in the labor force, vs. 62% in 2015. One study estimated that aging since 2000 has reduced productivity between 0.25% and 0.7% per year. Since GDP growth is a function of productivity (output per worker) and the number of workers, both trends slow the GDP growth rate. Older workers save more, which pushes interests rates down, offsetting some of the GDP growth reduction but reducing the Federal Reserve's ability to address a recession by lowering interest rates. Means of addressing the aging trend include immigration (which may bring in younger workers) and higher fertility rates, which can be encouraged by incentives to have more children (e.g., tax breaks, subsidies, and more generous paid leave).

The Congressional Budget Office estimated in May 2019 that mandatory spending (e.g., Medicare, Medicaid, and Social Security) will continue growing relative to the size of the economy (GDP) as the population ages. The population aged 65 or older is projected to rise by one-third from 2019–2029. Mandatory program spending (outlays) in 2019 were 12.7% of GDP and are projected to average 14.4% GDP from 2025–2029.

== Entrepreneurship ==
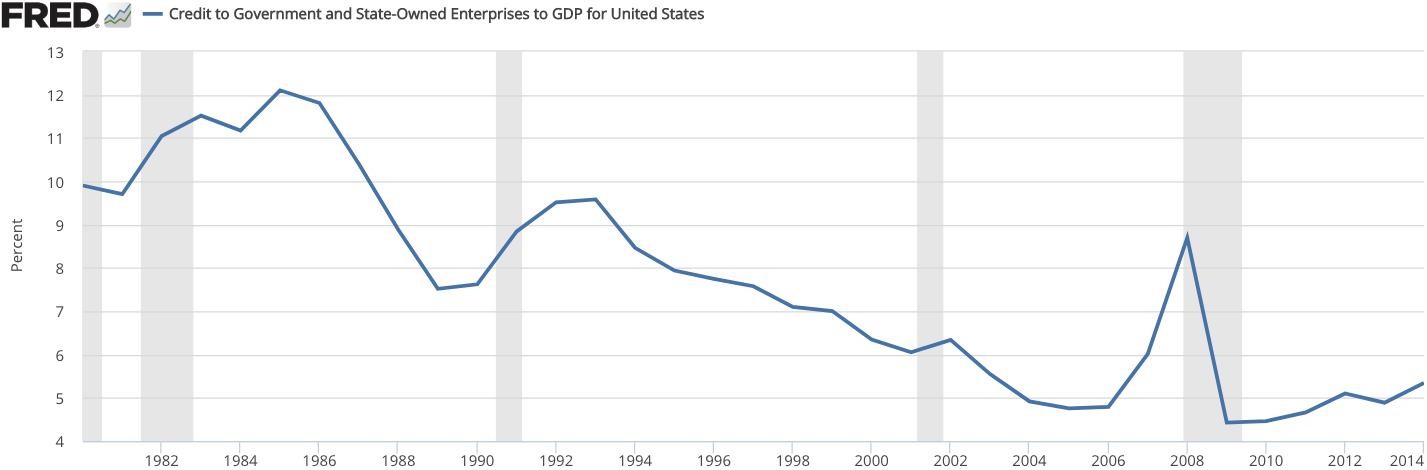
Percent of U.S. economy from state-owned enterprises or government-sponsored enterprises.

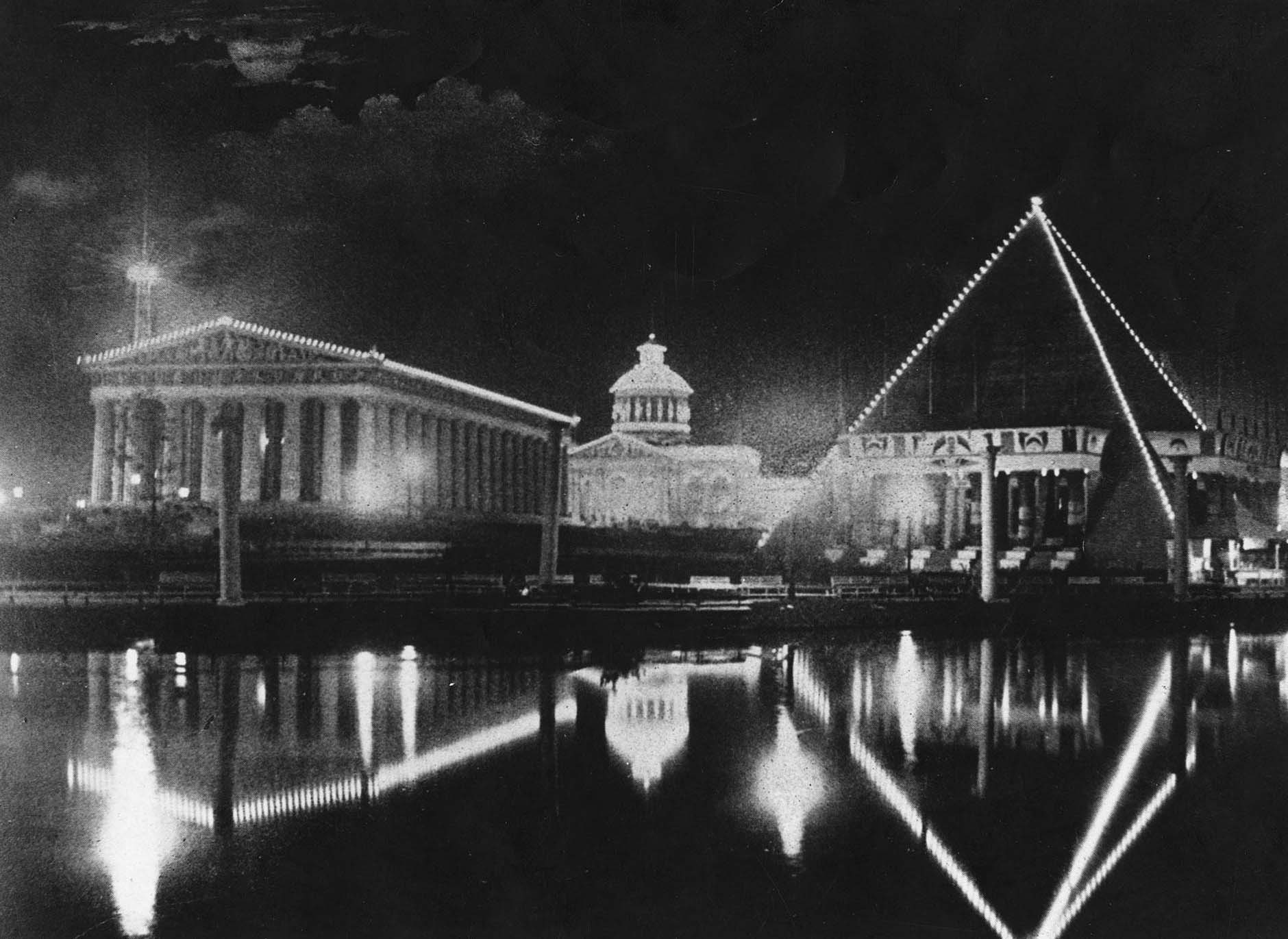
Tennessee in 1897. The U.S. was a leader in the adoption of electric lighting.

The United States has been a leader in technological innovation since the late 19th century and scientific research since the mid-20th century. In 1876, Alexander Graham Bell was awarded the first U.S. patent for the telephone. Thomas Edison's laboratory developed the phonograph, the first long-lasting light bulb, and the first viable movie camera. Edison's company would also pioneer (direct current based) electric power delivery and market it around the world, followed on by companies such as Westinghouse Electric Corporation which would rapidly develop alternating current power delivery. In the early 20th century, the automobile companies of Ransom E. Olds and Henry Ford popularized the assembly line. The Wright brothers, in 1903, made the first sustained and controlled heavier-than-air powered flight.

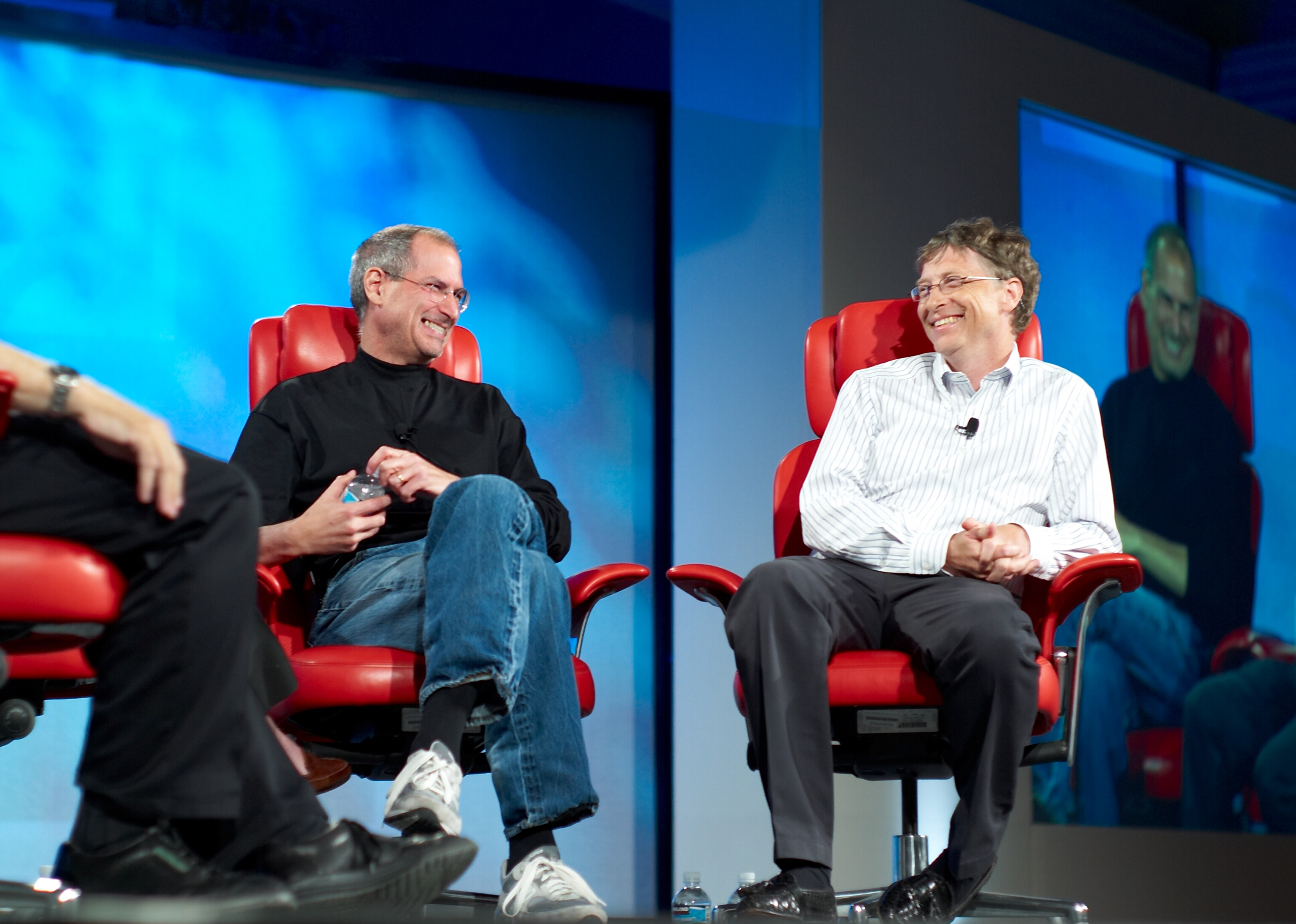
Steve Jobs and Bill Gates are two of the most well-known American entrepreneurs.

American society highly emphasizes entrepreneurship and business innovation that facilitates economic dynamism. Entrepreneurship is the act of being an entrepreneur, which can be defined as "one who undertakes innovations, finance and business acumen in an effort to transform innovations into economic goods". This may result in new organizations or may be part of revitalizing mature organizations in response to a perceived opportunity. American entrepreneurs are even engaged in public services delivery through public-private partnerships.

The most obvious form of entrepreneurship refers to the process and engagement of starting new businesses (referred to as startup companies); however, in recent years, the term has been extended to include social and political forms of entrepreneurial activity. When entrepreneurship is describing activities within a firm or large organization it is referred to as intra-preneurship and may include corporate venturing, when large entities spin-off organizations.

According to Paul Reynolds, entrepreneurship scholar and creator of the Global Entrepreneurship Monitor, "by the time they reach their retirement years, half of all working men in the United States probably have a period of self-employment of one or more years; one in four may have engaged in self-employment for six or more years. Participating in a new business creation is a common activity among U.S. workers over the course of their careers." And in recent years, business creation has been documented by scholars such as David Audretsch to be a major driver of economic growth in both the United States and Western Europe.

Survival rate of U.S. start-ups, 1977–2012. Source: U.S. Census Bureau, Business Dynamic Statistics, Published by Gallup, reproduced in UNESCO Science Report: towards 2030, Figure 5.7, p. 143

== Venture capital investment ==
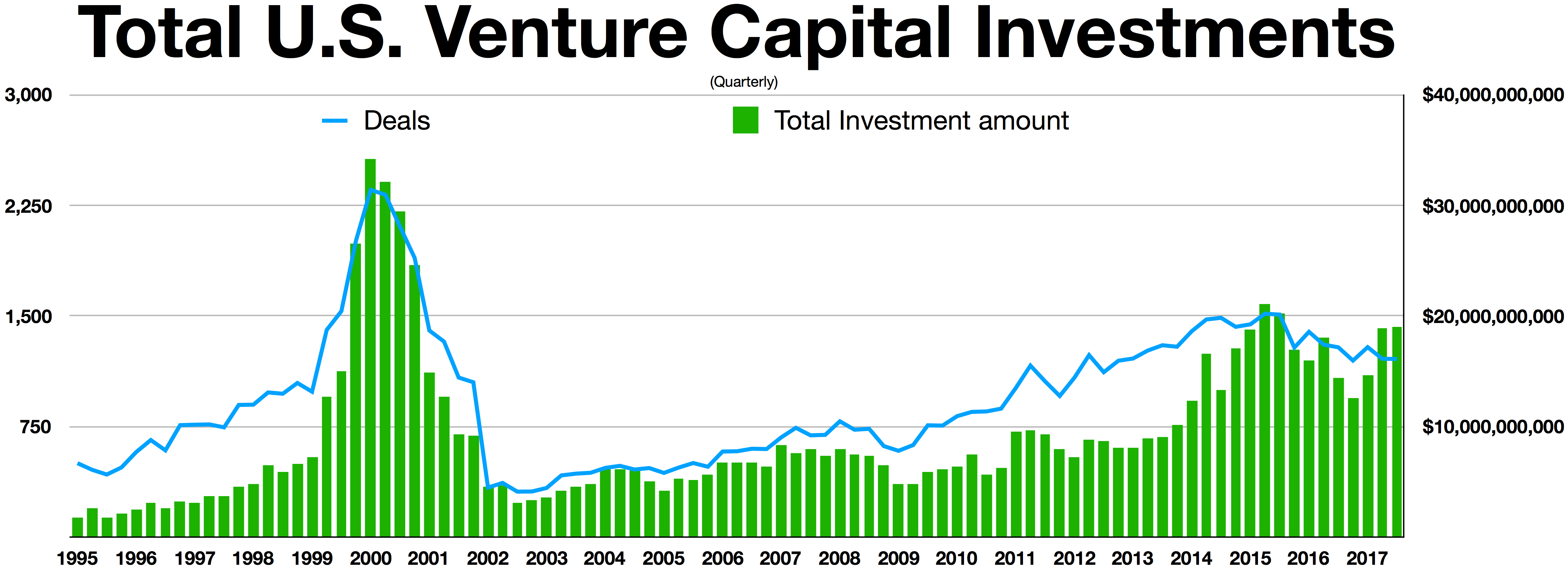
Quarterly U.S. venture capital investments, 1995–2017

Venture capital, as an industry, originated in the United States, which it still dominates. According to the National Venture Capital Association 11% of private sector jobs come from venture capital backed companies and venture capital backed revenue accounts for 21% of U.S. GDP.

Total U.S. investment in venture capital amounted to $48.3 billion in 2014, for 4,356 deals. This represented "an increase of 61% in dollars and a 4% increase in deals over the prior year", reported the National Venture Capital Association. The Organisation for Economic Cooperation and Development estimates that venture capital investment in the United States had fully recovered by 2014 to pre-recession levels. The National Venture Capital Association has reported that, in 2014, venture capital investment in the life sciences was at its highest level since 2008: in biotechnology, $6.0 billion was invested in 470 deals and, in life sciences overall, $8.6 billion in 789 deals (including biotechnology and medical devices).

Two thirds (68%) of the investment in biotechnology went to first-time/early-stage development deals and the remainder to the expansion stage of development (14%), seed-stage companies (11%) and late-stage companies (7%). However, it was the software industry which invested in the greatest number of deals overall: 1,799, for an investment of $19.8 billion. Second came internet-specific companies, garnering US$11.9 billion in investment through 1,005 deals. Many of these companies are based in the state of California, which alone concentrates 28% of U.S. research.

Some new American businesses raise investments from angel investors (venture capitalists). In 2010 healthcare/medical accounted for the largest share of angel investments, with 30% of total angel investments (vs. 17% in 2009), followed by software (16% vs. 19% in 2007), biotech (15% vs. 8% in 2009), industrial/energy (8% vs. 17% in 2009), retail (5% vs. 8% in 2009) and IT services (5%).

Americans are "venturesome consumers" who are unusually willing to try new products of all sorts, and to pester manufacturers to improve their products.

== Mergers and acquisitions ==
Since 1985 there have been three major waves of mergers and acquisitions in the country. 2017 has been the most active year in terms of number of deals (12,914), whereas 2015 accumulated to the biggest overall value of deals ($24 billion).

The biggest merger deal in U.S. history was the acquisition of Time Warner by America Online Inc. in 2000, where the bid was over $164 billion. Since 2000 acquisitions of U.S. companies by Chinese investors increased by 368%. The other way round—U.S. companies acquiring Chinese Companies—showed a decrease of 25%, with a short upwards trend until 2007.

== Research and development ==
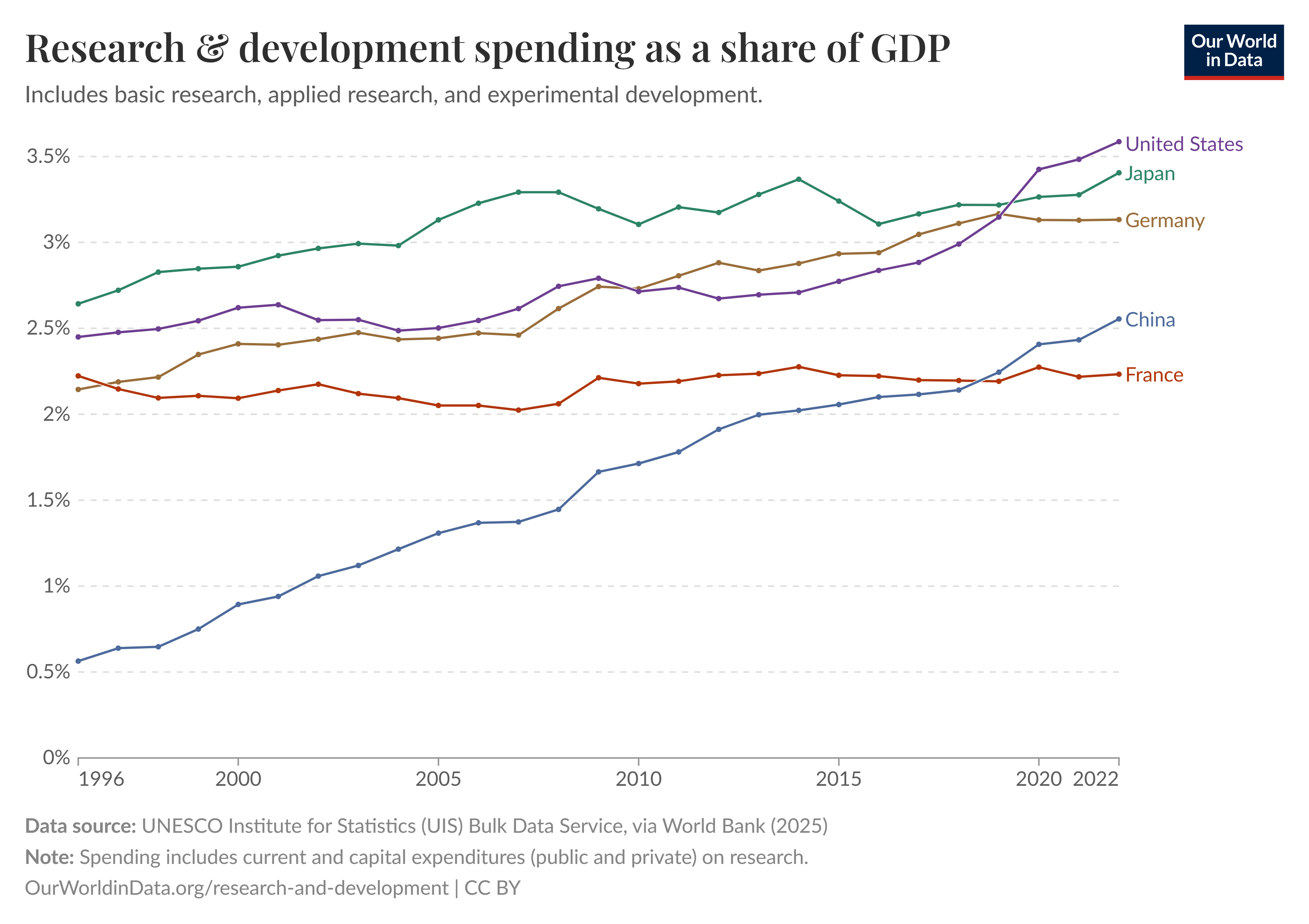
Gross domestic expenditure on R&D in the U.S. as a percentage of GDP, 1996–2022. Other countries are given for comparison.

The U.S. invests more funds in research and development (R&D) in absolute terms than the other G7 nations combined: 17.2% more in 2012. Since 2000, gross domestic expenditure on R&D (GERD) in the U.S. has increased by 31.2%, enabling it to maintain its share of GERD among the G7 nations at 54.0% (54.2% in 2000).

[[File:R&D by country.webp|thumb|center|

R&D by country]]

=== Impact of recession on research spending ===
Generally speaking, U.S. investment in R&D rose with the economy in the first years of the century before receding slightly during the economic recession then rising again as growth resumed. At its peak in 2009, GERD amounted to US$406 billion (2.82% of GDP). Despite the recession, it was still at 2.79% in 2012 and will slide only marginally to 2.73% in 2013, according to provisional data, and should remain at a similar level in 2014.

The federal government is the primary funder of basic research, at 52.6% in 2012; state governments, universities and other non-profits funded 26%. Experimental development, on the other hand, is primarily funded by industry: 76.4% to the federal government's 22.1% in 2012. While U.S. investment in R&D is high, it failed to reach President Obama's target of 3% of GDP by the end of his presidency in 2016. Between 2009 and 2012, the United States' world share of research expenditure receded slightly from 30.5% to 28.1%. Several countries now devote more than 4% of GDP to R&D (Israel, Japan and the Republic of Korea) and others plan to raise their own GERD/GDP ratio to 4% by 2020 (Finland and Sweden).

=== Business spending on research ===
Business enterprises contributed 59.1 % of U.S. GERD in 2012, down from 69.0 % in 2000. Private non-profits and foreign entities each contribute a small fraction of total R&D, 3.3% and 3.8%, respectively.

US research and development budget by government agency, 1994–2014. Source: UNESCO Science Report: towards 2030, Figure 5.4, based on data from American Association for the Advancement of Science

The United States has historically been a leader in business R&D and innovation. The economic recession of 2008–2009 has had a lasting impact, however. While the major performers of R&D largely maintained their commitments, the pain of the U.S. recession was felt mainly by small businesses and start-ups. Statistics released by the U.S. Census Bureau showed that, in 2008, the number of business 'deaths' began overtaking the number of business 'births' and that the trend continued at least through 2012. From 2003 to 2008, business research spending had followed a generally upward trajectory. In 2009, the curve inverted, as expenditure fell by 4% over the previous year then again in 2010, albeit by 1–2% this time. Companies in high-opportunity industries like health care cut back less than those in more mature industries, such as fossil fuels. The largest cutbacks in R&D spending were in agriculture production: −3.5% compared to the average R&D to net sales ratio. The chemicals and allied products industry and electronic equipment industry, on the other hand, showed R&D to net sales ratios that were 3.8% and 4.8% higher than average. Although the amount of R&D spending increased in 2011, it was still below the level of 2008 expenditure. By 2012, the growth rate of business-funded R&D had recovered. Whether this continues will be contingent on the pursuit of economic recovery and growth, levels of federal research funding and the general business climate.

=== Research spending at the state level ===
The level of research spending varies considerably from one state to another. Six states (New Mexico, Maryland, Massachusetts, Washington, California and Michigan) each devoted 3.9% or more of their GDP to R&D in 2010, together contributing 42% of national research expenditure. In 2010, more than one quarter of R&D was concentrated in California (28.1%), ahead of Massachusetts (5.7%), New Jersey (5.6%), Washington State (5.5%), Michigan (5.4%), Texas (5.2%), Illinois (4.8%), New York (3.6%) and Pennsylvania (3.5%). Seven states (Arkansas, Nevada, Oklahoma, Louisiana, South Dakota and Wyoming) devoted less than 0.8% of GDP to R&D.

Science and engineering in the U.S. by state. Source: UNESCO Science Report: towards 2030, Figure 5.6, based on data from American Association for the Advancement of Science

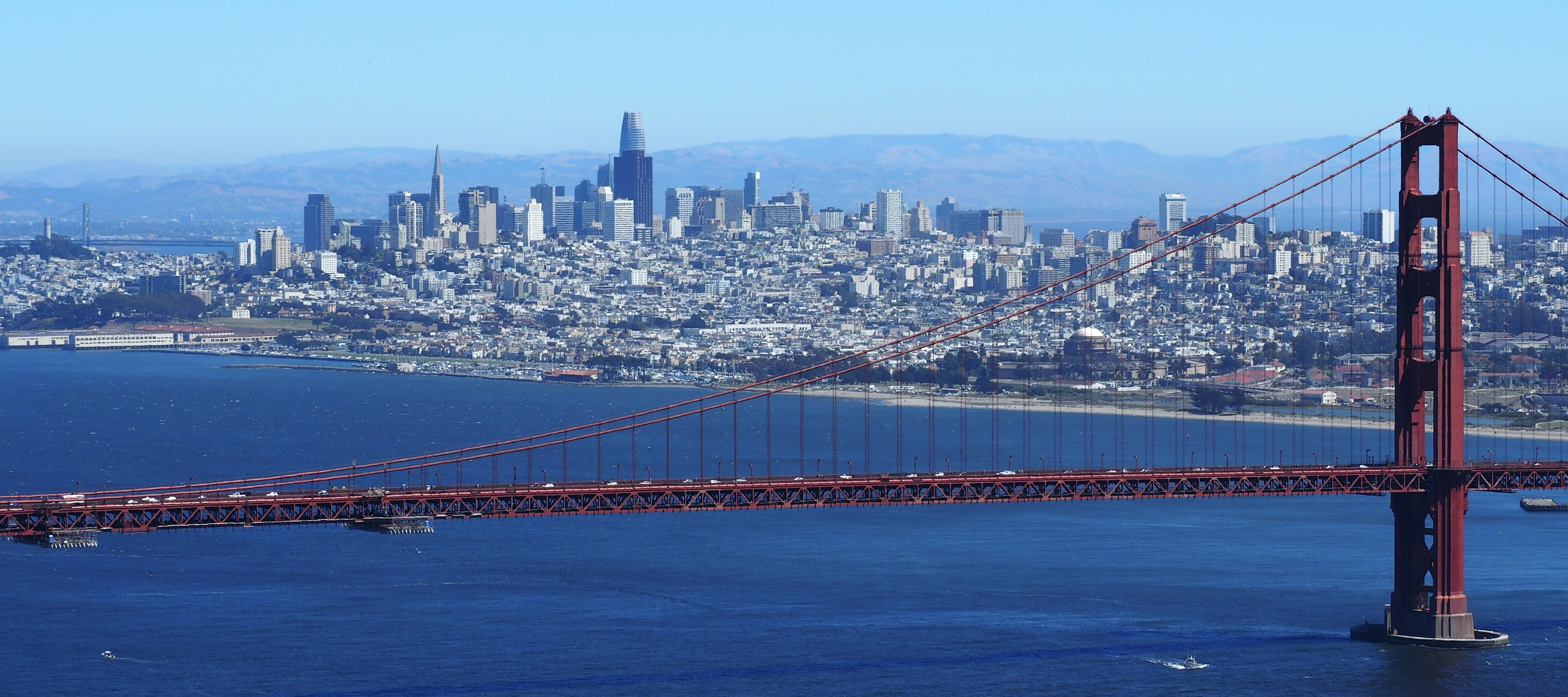
San Francisco is one of the world's largest financial centers.

California is home to Silicon Valley, the name given to the area hosting the leading corporations and start-ups in information technology. This state also hosts biotechnology clusters in the San Francisco Bay Area, Los Angeles and San Diego. The main biotechnology clusters outside California are the cities of Boston/Cambridge, Massachusetts, Maryland, suburban Washington, DC, New York, Seattle, Philadelphia, and Chicago. California supplies 13.7% of all jobs in science and engineering across the country, more than any other state. Some 5.7% of Californians are employed in these fields. Route 128 around Boston in the state of Massachusetts is not only home to numerous high-tech firms and corporations but also hosts Harvard University and Massachusetts Institute of Technology.

New Mexico's high research intensity can be explained by the fact that it hosts the Los Alamos National Laboratory. Maryland's position may reflect the concentration of federally funded research institutions there. Washington State has a high concentration of high-tech firms like Microsoft, Amazon and Boeing and the engineering functions of most automobile manufacturers are located in the state of Michigan.

=== Research spending by multinational corporations ===
The federal government and most of the 50 states that make up the United States offer tax credits to particular industries and companies to encourage them to engage in research and development (R&D). Congress usually renews a tax credit every few years. According to a survey by The Wall Street Journal in 2012, companies do not factor in these credits when making decisions about investing in R&D, since they cannot rely on these credits being renewed.

In 2014, four U.S. multinational corporations figured in the Top 50 for the volume of expenditure on R&D: Microsoft, Intel, Johnson & Johnson and Google. Several have figured in the Top 20 for at least ten years: Intel, Microsoft, Johnson & Johnson, Pfizer and IBM. Google was included in this table for the first time in 2013.

Global top 50 companies by R&D volume and intensity, 2014 * R&D intensity is defined as R&D expenditure divided by net sales. ** Although incorporated in the Netherlands, Airbus's principal manufacturing facilities are located in France, Germany, Spain and the UK. Source: UNESCO Science Report: towards 2030 (2015), Table 9.3, based on Hernández et al. (2014) EU R&D Scoreboard: the 2014 EU Industrial R&D Investment Scoreboard. European Commission: Brussels, Table 2.2.

=== Exports of high-tech goods and patents ===
High-tech exports from the U.S. as a percentage of the world share, 2008–2013. Source: UNESCO Science Report: towards 2030, Figure 5.10, based on Comtrade database

Until 2010, the United States was a net exporter of pharmaceuticals but, since 2011, it has become a net importer of these goods.

The United States is a post-industrial country. Imports of high-tech products far exceed exports. However, the United States' technologically skilled workforce produces a large volume of patents and can still profit from the license or sale of these patents. Within the United States' scientific industries active in research, 9.1% of products and services are concerned with the licensing of intellectual property rights.

When it comes to trade in intellectual property, the United States remains unrivalled. Income from royalties and licensing amounted to $129.2 billion in 2013, the highest in the world. Japan comes a distant second, with receipts of $31.6 billion in 2013. The United States' payments for use of intellectual property amounted to $39.0 billion in 2013, exceeded only by Ireland ($46.4 billion).

== Notable companies and markets ==
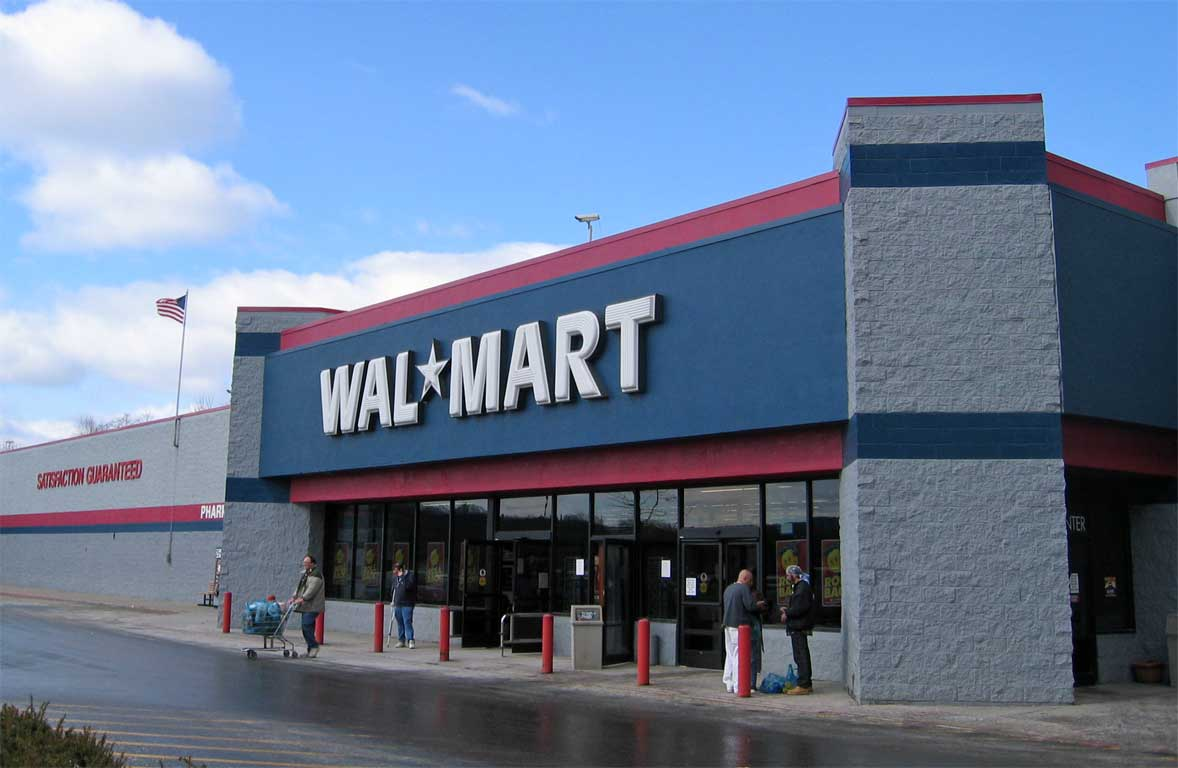
A typical Walmart discount department store (location: Laredo, Texas)

America's largest companies are ranked every year by revenue in the Fortune 500. Between 2000 and 2022's edition of the list, the top spot on the Fortune 500 was occupied by either the auto manufacturer General Motors (GM), the oil and gas giant ExxonMobil, or the retailer Walmart. The US is also home of many of the world's largest companies by market capitalization; As of February 9, 2023, the largest American companies by market cap are Apple, Microsoft, Google (through holding company Alphabet), Amazon, Berkshire Hathaway, Tesla, Nvidia, Visa, ExxonMobil, and Meta Platforms. Moreover, many of these companies are the most valuable brands, with many of the largest companies by revenue and market cap on the annual ranking of most valuable brands by Forbes being joined by Coca-Cola, The Walt Disney Company, and McDonald's.

Some industries within America are defined by a few major companies, often deriving terms such as "Big Three" or "Big Four". Examples of this phenomenon include the Big Three credit reporting agencies (Equifax, Experian, and TransUnion), the Big Three automobile makers (Ford, General Motors, and Stellantis), the Big Four accounting firms (Deloitte, Ernst & Young, KPMG, and PwC), and the Big Four communications carriers (Verizon, AT&T, T-Mobile/Sprint, and Dish Network). The American energy industry is among the largest and consists of large companies in oil, natural gas, coal, and renewable energy sources. America's largest energy companies by market are in oil and gas, with ExxonMobil being joined by Chevron, ConocoPhillips, and Schlumberger; British oil companies BP and Shell also have significant presence in the United States and trade on both the London Stock Exchange and New York Stock Exchange. Many large American petroleum companies, as well as BP, can trace some origin back to Standard Oil, a former monopoly run by John D. Rockefeller. In coal, the $30 billion industry is dominated by Peabody Energy, which is the largest coal company in the world with almost $23 billion in revenue for 2021. Much of the nation's coal mining occurs in Wyoming and Appalachian states like West Virginia, Pennsylvania, and Kentucky.

A 2012 Deloitte report published in STORES magazine indicated that of the world's top 250 largest retailers by retail sales revenue in fiscal year 2010, 32% of those retailers were based in the United States, and those 32% accounted for 41% of the total retail sales revenue of the top 250.

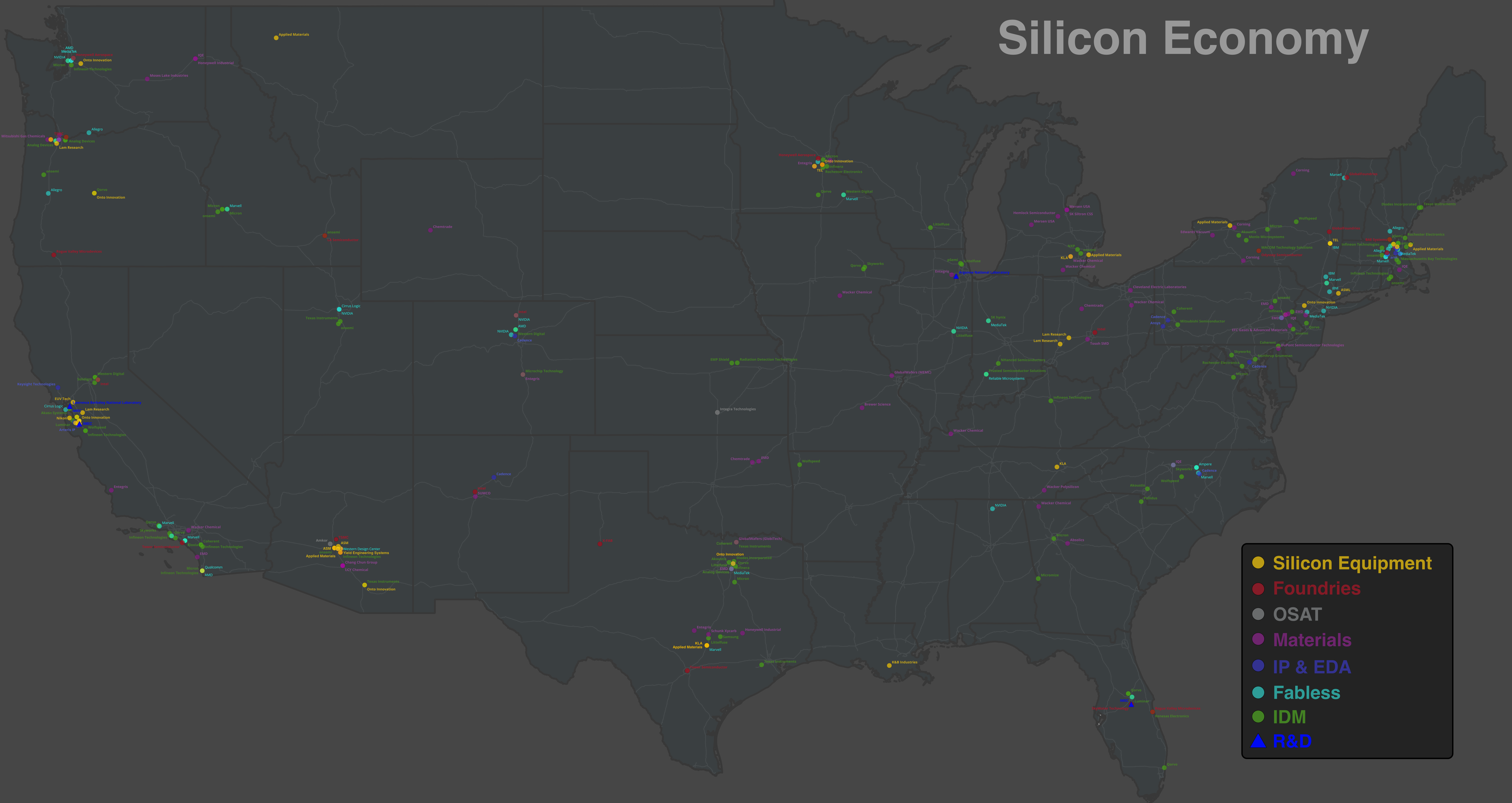
Semiconductor companies in the United States

America is the foremost country in the world when it comes to semiconductor production. In 2011, half of the world's 20 largest semiconductor manufacturers by sales were based in America. More recently, Congress under the presidency of Joe Biden passed a bipartisan bill, the CHIPS and Science Act, which bolstered semiconductor production. Some of America's largest semiconductor firms and chip companies are Broadcom, Intel, AMD, and Qualcomm.

Many of the United States' largest firms by market cap are technology companies. These companies are dominated by the Big Five tech giants (Apple, Amazon, Google, Microsoft, and Meta), though numerous software firms also dominate the American technology industry. These firms range from hardware manufacturers like Dell Technologies, IBM, Hewlett-Packard, and Cisco, to software and computing infrastructure programmers like Oracle, Salesforce, Adobe, and Intuit.

In film, American producers create nearly all of the world's highest-grossing films. Many of the world's best-selling music artists are based in the United States. Some of America's largest media companies are The Walt Disney Company, Warner Bros. Discovery, Netflix, Comcast, Paramount Global, and Fox.

== Banking and finance ==
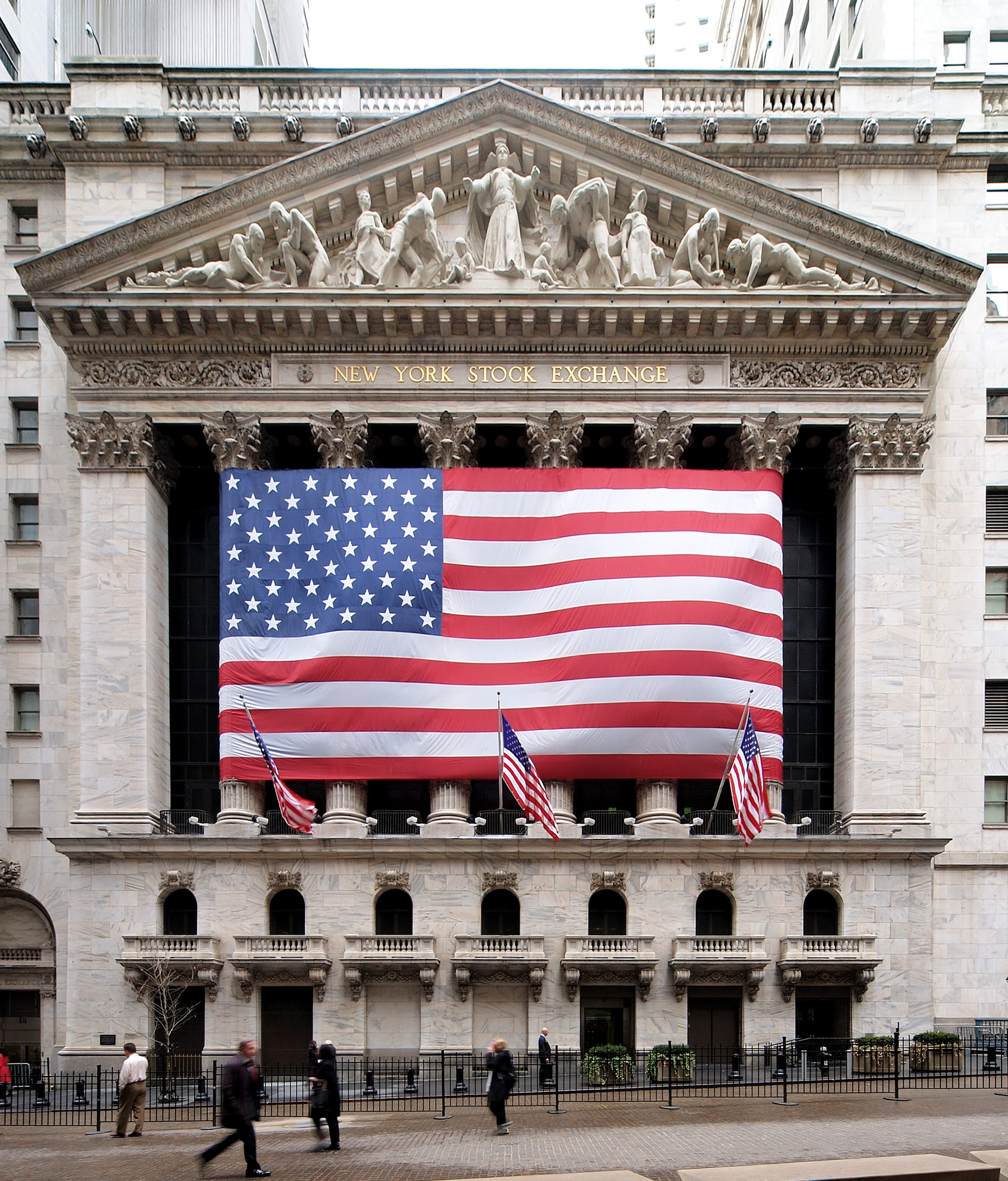
The New York Stock Exchange is the largest stock exchange in the world.

Measured by value of its listed companies' securities, the New York Stock Exchange is more than three times larger than any other stock exchange in the world. As of October 2008, the combined capitalization of all domestic NYSE listed companies was US$10.1 trillion. NASDAQ is another American stock exchange and the world's third-largest exchange after the New York Stock Exchange and Japan's Tokyo Stock Exchange. However, NASDAQ's trade value is larger than Japan's TSE. NASDAQ is the largest electronic screen-based equity securities trading market in the U.S. With approximately 3,800 companies and corporations, it has more trading volume per hour than any other stock exchange.

Because of the influential role that the U.S. stock market plays in international finance, a New York University study in late 2014 interprets that in the short run, stocks that affect the willingness to bear risk independently of macroeconomic fundamentals explain most of the variation in the U.S. stock market. In the long run, the U.S. stock market is profoundly affected by shocks that reallocate the rewards of a given level of production between workers and shareholders. Productivity shocks, however, play a small role in historical stock market fluctuations at all horizons in the U.S. stock market.

The U.S. finance industry comprised only 10% of total non-farm business profits in 1947, but it grew to 50% by 2010. Over the same period, finance industry income as a proportion of GDP rose from 2.5% to 7.5%, and the finance industry's proportion of all corporate income rose from 10% to 20%. The mean earnings per employee hour in finance relative to all other sectors has closely mirrored the share of total U.S. income earned by the top 1% income earners since 1930. The mean salary in New York City's finance industry rose from $80,000 in 1981 to $360,000 in 2011, while average New York City salaries rose from $40,000 to $70,000. In 1988, there were about 12,500 U.S. banks with less than $300 million in deposits, and about 900 with more deposits, but by 2012, there were only 4,200 banks with less than $300 million in deposits in the U.S., and over 1,800 with more.

Top ten U.S. banks by assets

1	JP Morgan Chase
2	Bank of America
3	Citigroup
4	Wells Fargo
5	Goldman Sachs
6	Morgan Stanley
7	U.S. Bancorp
8	Bank of NY Mellon
9	HSBC North American Holdings
10	Capital One Financial

A 2012 International Monetary Fund study concluded that the U.S. financial sector has grown so large that it is slowing economic growth. New York University economist Thomas Philippon supported those findings, estimating that the U.S. spends $300 billion too much on financial services per year, and that the sector needs to shrink by 20%. Harvard University and University of Chicago economists agreed, calculating in 2014 that workers in research and development add $5 to the GDP for each dollar they earn, but finance industry workers cause the GDP to shrink by $0.60 for every dollar they are paid. A study by the Bank for International Settlements reached similar conclusions, saying the finance industry impedes economic growth and research and development based industries.

== List of state and territory economies ==
=== State and federal district economies ===
- Economy of Alabama
- Economy of Alaska
- Economy of Arizona
- Economy of Arkansas
- Economy of California
- Economy of Colorado
- Economy of Connecticut
- Economy of Delaware
- Economy of Florida
- Economy of Georgia
- Economy of Hawaii
- Economy of Idaho
- Economy of Illinois
- Economy of Indiana
- Economy of Iowa
- Economy of Kansas
- Economy of Kentucky
- Economy of Louisiana
- Economy of Maine
- Economy of Maryland
- Economy of Massachusetts
- Economy of Michigan
- Economy of Minnesota
- Economy of Mississippi
- Economy of Missouri
- Economy of Montana
- Economy of Nebraska
- Economy of Nevada
- Economy of New Hampshire
- Economy of New Jersey
- Economy of New Mexico
- Economy of New York (state)
- Economy of North Carolina
- Economy of North Dakota
- Economy of Ohio
- Economy of Oklahoma
- Economy of Oregon
- Economy of Pennsylvania
- Economy of Rhode Island
- Economy of South Carolina
- Economy of South Dakota
- Economy of Tennessee
- Economy of Texas
- Economy of Utah
- Economy of Vermont
- Economy of Virginia
- Economy of Washington, D.C.
- Economy of Washington (state)
- Economy of West Virginia
- Economy of Wisconsin
- Economy of Wyoming

=== Territory economies ===
- Economy of American Samoa
- Economy of Guam
- Economy of the Northern Mariana Islands
- Economy of Puerto Rico
- Economy of the United States Virgin Islands

== See also ==
- Energy policy of the United States
- Historical Statistics of the United States
- Labor unions in the United States
- Unemployment insurance in the United States
