= List of U.S. states by minimum wage =

US map of hourly minimum wages by state and District of Columbia (D.C.), in US dollars.

This is a list of minimum wage rates of the 50 U.S. states and the federal district of Washington, D.C. For comparisons to other countries see: List of countries by minimum wage.

See minimum wage in the United States for much more information, including detailed state-by-state and city-by-city breakdown of the facts and numbers, and more information on US territories. Some of the sources list many more exceptions to the main rate in each state (both lower or higher than the statewide rate). The main source for the information is the U.S. Department of Labor.

== Table notes ==
Tables do not include info on pay for tipped, part-time, overtime, or underage employees.

- State links below are "Economy of STATE" links.

== Table, 2026 and 2025 ==
** Varies by geographical location within the state.

*** State does not have local minimum wage regulations, and instead adheres to federal minimum wage laws.

† State minimum wage is lower than the federal minimum wage. Most – but not all – employees are paid according to federal regulations.

U.S. state minimum wage rates. 2026 and 2025.
State	2026	2025
Alabama***	$7.25	$7.25
Alaska	$14.00 (effective July 1, 2026)	$13.00
Arizona	$15.15	$14.70
Arkansas	$11.00	$11.00
California**	$16.90 (Wage by city in California)	$16.50
Colorado**	$15.16	$14.81
Connecticut	$16.94	$16.35
Delaware	$15.00	$15.00
Florida	$15.00 (effective Sept. 30, 2026)	$14.00
Georgia†	$7.25	$7.25
Hawaii	$16.00	$14.00
Idaho	$7.25	$7.25
Illinois	$15.00	$15.00
Indiana	$7.25	$7.25
Iowa	$7.25	$7.25
Kansas	$7.25	$7.25
Kentucky	$7.25	$7.25
Louisiana***	$7.25	$7.25
Maine	$15.10	$14.65
Maryland**	$15.00	$15.00
Massachusetts	$15.00	$15.00
Michigan	$13.73	$10.56
Minnesota	$11.41	$11.13
Mississippi***	$7.25	$7.25
Missouri	$15.00	$13.75
Montana	$10.85	$10.55
Nebraska	$15.00	$13.50
Nevada	$12.00	$12.00
New Hampshire	$7.25	$7.25
New Jersey	$15.92 for businesses with 6 or more employees $14.23 – businesses with fewer than 6 and seasonal employees	$15.49 for businesses with 6 or more employees $13.73 for businesses with fewer than 6 and seasonal employees
New Mexico	$12.00	$12.00
New York**	$17.00 (New York City, Long Island and Westchester) $16.00 (Rest of the state)	$16.50 per hour (New York City, Long Island and Westchester County) $15.50 per hour (rest of the state)
North Carolina	$7.25	$7.25
North Dakota	$7.25	$7.25
Ohio	$11.00	$10.70
Oklahoma	$7.25	$7.25
Oregon**	$16.30 (Portland metro); $15.05 (standard); $14.05 (non-urban)	$14.70 (standard)
Pennsylvania	$7.25	$7.25
Rhode Island	$16.00	$15.00
South Carolina***	$7.25	$7.25
South Dakota	$11.85	$11.50
Tennessee***	$7.25	$7.25
Texas	$7.25	$7.25
Utah	$7.25	$7.25
Vermont	$14.42	$14.01
Virginia	$12.77	$12.41
Washington	$17.13	$16.66
Washington, D.C.	$17.95	$17.50
West Virginia	$8.75	$8.75
Wisconsin	$7.25	$7.25
Wyoming†	$7.25	$7.25

== Table, 2022–2024 ==
U.S. state minimum wage rates. 2022-2024.
State	2022	2023	2024
Alabama	$7.25 (Note: Federal, no state minimum)	$7.25	$7.25
Alaska	$10.34	$10.85	$11.73
Arizona	$12.80	$13.85	$14.35
Arkansas	$11.00	$11.00	$11.00/7.25 (Note: Arkansas. $11.00 (4 or more employees). $7.25 (Less than 4 employees).)
California	$15.00	$15.50	$16.00
Colorado	$12.56	$13.65	$14.42
Connecticut	$14.00	$15.00	$15.69
Delaware	$10.50	$11.75	$13.25
Florida	$11.00	$12.00	$12.00. $13.00 on Sept 30, 2024
Georgia	$7.25 (Note: Employers subject to the Fair Labor Standards Act must pay the $7.25 federal minimum wage.)	$7.25	$7.25
Hawaii	$10.10	$12.00	$14.00
Idaho	$7.25	$7.25	$7.25
Illinois	$12.00	$13.00	$14.00
Indiana	$7.25	$7.25	$7.25
Iowa	$7.25	$7.25	$7.25
Kansas	$7.25	$7.25	$7.25
Kentucky	$7.25	$7.25	$7.25
Louisiana	$7.25	$7.25	$7.25
Maine	$12.75	$13.80	$14.15
Maryland	$12.50	$13.25	$15.00
Massachusetts	$14.25	$15.00	$15.00
Michigan	$9.87	$10.10	$10.33
Minnesota	$10.33/8.42 (Note: Minnesota. The higher minimum wage applies to employers with annual gross revenues of at least $500,000. The lower minimum wage applies to smaller employers with annual gross revenues below $500,000.)	$10.59/8.63	$10.85/$8.85
Mississippi	$7.25	$7.25	$7.25
Missouri	$11.15	$12.00	$12.30/$7.25 (Note: Missouri. Employers engaged in retail or service businesses whose annual gross income is less than $500,000 are not required to pay the state minimum wage rate. Employers subject to the Fair Labor Standards Act must pay the $7.25 federal minimum wage.)
Montana	$9.20	$9.95	$10.30
Nebraska	$9.00	$10.50	$12.00
Nevada	$10.50/9.50 (Note: Nevada. The lower minimum wage is for employees who are offered health insurance. Employees who are not offered health insurance must receive the higher minimum wage.)	$11.25/10.25	$11.25/10.25. $12.00 for all on July 1, 2024
New Hampshire	$7.25	$7.25	$7.25
New Jersey	$13.00/11.90 (Note: New Jersey. The higher minimum wage applies to non-seasonal employers of 6 or more employees. The lower minimum wage applies to seasonal or smaller employers of 5 or fewer employees.)	$14.13/11.90	$15.13/ 13.73
New Mexico	$11.50	$12.00	$12.00
New York	$13.20	$14.20	$15.00
North Carolina	$7.25	$7.25	$7.25
North Dakota	$7.25	$7.25	$7.25
Ohio	$9.30/7.25 (Note: Ohio. The higher minimum wage applies to employers with annual gross revenues of a specified minimum amount ($394,000 in 2025, $385,000 in 2024, $372,000 in 2023, $342,000 in 2022, $323,000 in 2021, $319,000 in 2020, and $314,000 in 2019). The federal minimum wage of $7.25 applies to smaller employers with annual gross revenues below the specified minimum amount.)	$10.10/7.25	$10.45/7.25
Oklahoma	$7.25	$7.25	$7.25/2.00. (Note: Oklahoma. Basic Minimum Rate (per hour) is $7.25 for employers with ten or more full time employees at any one location or employers with annual gross sales over $100,000 irrespective of number of full time employees. All other employers: Basic Minimum Rate (per hour): $2.00. Unless the employers are subject to the Fair Labor Standards Act, in which case they must pay the $7.25 federal minimum wage.)
Oregon	$13.50 (Note: Oregon. The Oregon minimum wage is adjusted annually on July 1 based on a set formula. There is a higher minimum wage in the Portland metro area and a lower minimum wage in non-urban counties.)	$14.20	$14.20. $14.70 on July 1, 2024
Pennsylvania	$7.25	$7.25	$7.25
Rhode Island	$12.25	$13.00	$14.00
South Carolina	$7.25	$7.25	$7.25
South Dakota	$9.95	$10.80	$11.20
Tennessee	$7.25	$7.25	$7.25
Texas	$7.25	$7.25	$7.25
Utah	$7.25	$7.25	$7.25
Vermont	$12.55	$13.18	$13.67
Virginia	$11.00	$12.00	$12.00
Washington	$14.49	$15.74	$16.28
Washington, D.C.	$16.10	$17.00	$17.00. $17.50 on July 1, 2024
West Virginia	$8.75/7.25 (Note: West Virginia. $8.75 applies to employers of 6 or more employees at one specific location. Employers of 5 or fewer employees at one specific location must pay the federal minimum wage of $7.25 per hour.)	$8.75/7.25	$8.75/7.25
Wisconsin	$7.25	$7.25	$7.25
Wyoming	$7.25	$7.25	$7.25

== Table, 2019–2021 ==
U.S. state minimum wage rates. 2019-2021.
State	2019	2020	2021
Alabama	$7.25	$7.25	$7.25
Alaska	$9.89	$10.19	$10.34
Arizona	$11.00	$12.00	$12.15
Arkansas	$9.25	$10.00	$11.00
California	$12.00	$13.00	$14.00
Colorado	$11.10	$12.00	$12.32
Connecticut	$11.00	$12.00	$13.00
Delaware	$8.75	$9.25	$9.25
Florida	$8.46	$8.56	$10.00
Georgia	$7.25	$7.25	$7.25
Hawaii	$10.10	$10.10	$10.10
Idaho	$7.25	$7.25	$7.25
Illinois	$9.25	$10.00	$11.00
Indiana	$7.25	$7.25	$7.25
Iowa	$7.25	$7.25	$7.25
Kansas	$7.25	$7.25	$7.25
Kentucky	$7.25	$7.25	$7.25
Louisiana	$7.25	$7.25	$7.25
Maine	$11.00	$12.00	$12.15
Maryland	$10.10	$11.00	$11.75
Massachusetts	$12.00	$12.75	$13.50
Michigan	$9.45	$9.65	$9.65
Minnesota	$9.86/8.04	$10.00/8.15	$10.08/8.21
Mississippi	$7.25	$7.25	$7.25
Missouri	$8.60	$9.45	$10.30
Montana	$8.50	$8.65	$8.75
Nebraska	$9.00	$9.00	$9.00
Nevada	$8.25/7.25	$9.00/8.00	$9.75/8.75
New Hampshire	$7.25	$7.25	$7.25
New Jersey	$10.00	$11.00	$12.00
New Mexico	$7.50	$9.00	$10.50
New York	$11.10	$11.80	$12.50
North Carolina	$7.25	$7.25	$7.25
North Dakota	$7.25	$7.25	$7.25
Ohio	$8.55/7.25	$8.70/7.25	$8.80/7.25
Oklahoma	$7.25	$7.25	$7.25
Oregon	$11.25	$12.00	$12.75
Pennsylvania	$7.25	$7.25	$7.25
Rhode Island	$10.50	$11.50	$11.50
South Carolina	$7.25	$7.25	$7.25
South Dakota	$9.10	$9.30	$9.45
Tennessee	$7.25	$7.25	$7.25
Texas	$7.25	$7.25	$7.25
Utah	$7.25	$7.25	$7.25
Vermont	$10.78	$10.96	$11.75
Virginia	$7.25	$7.25	$9.50
Washington	$12.00	$13.50	$13.69
Washington, D.C.	$14.00	$15.00	$15.20
West Virginia	$8.75/7.25	$8.75/7.25	$8.75/7.25
Wisconsin	$7.25	$7.25	$7.25
Wyoming	$7.25	$7.25	$7.25

== Notes by state ==
This section breaks it down further by state. These are the main exceptions to the main rates in some states. There are many more exceptions in the sources.

== Consolidated minimum wage table ==
Below is a compact table of the minimum wages by U.S. state, U.S. territory, and the District of Columbia. This table is an exact duplicate of the Department of Labor source page ("Consolidated Minimum Wage Table"). So it may be out of date at times. See date on table at source. The federal minimum wage applies in states with no state minimum wage or a minimum wage lower than the federal rate (column titled "No state MW or state MW is lower than $7.25."). Some of the state rates below are higher than the rate on the main table above. That is because the main table does not use the rate for cities or regions. See the main U.S. Department of Labor source for details.

Notes:

- See state and territory abbreviations list.
- Go to source for more details by state (such as the superscript numbers).
- Territories listed in this table (see bottom of columns too):

AS = American Samoa. CNMI = Northern Mariana Islands. GU = Guam. PR = Puerto Rico. VI = U.S. Virgin Islands.

Consolidated State Minimum Wage Update Table (Effective Date: January 1, 2026)
Greater than federal MW	Equals federal MW of $7.25	No state MW or state MW is lower than $7.25. Employers covered by the FLSA must pay the federal MW of $7.25.
AK $13.00	CNMI	AL
AR $11.00	IA	GA
AZ $15.15	ID	LA
CA $16.90	IN	MS
CO $15.16	KS	SC
CT $16.94	KY	TN
DC $17.95	NC	WY
DE $15.00	ND	AS^{2}
FL $14.00	NH	
HI $16.00	OK	
IL $15.00	PA	
MA $15.00	TX	
MD $15.00	UT	
ME $15.10	WI	
MI $13.73		
MN $11.41		
MO $15.00		
MT $10.85^{3}		
NE $15.00		
NJ $15.92 or $15.23^{4}		
NM $12.00		
NV $12.00		
NY $17.00 or $16.00^{5}		
OH $11.00 or $7.25^{6}		
OR $16.30 or $15.05 or $14.05^{7}		
PR $10.50		
RI $16.00		
SD $11.85		
VA $12.77		
VT $14.42		
WA $17.13		
WV $8.75		
VI $10.50		
GU $9.25		
30 States + DC, GU, PR& VI	13 States + CNMI	7 States + AS

== Graphic showing yearly increases by year by state ==
Minimum wage increases by state and year

== See also ==
- Timeline of federal minimum hourly wage for the United States (including inflation-adjusted)
- List of United States state legislatures (party control of legislatures and governors).
- Average worker's wage
- Fair Labor Standards Act of 1938
- History of labor law in the United States
- Income inequality in the United States
- List of countries by minimum wage
- Living wage
- Maximum wage
- Minimum Wage Fixing Convention 1970
- Minimum wage law
- Price/wage spiral
- United States labor law
- Wage slavery
- Wage theft (Act by employer of failing to pay wage per contract or legal required)
- Working poor
- List of countries by average wage
- List of countries by median wage
- List of countries by wealth per adult
- List of minimum wages in Canada
- List of minimum wages in China (PRC)
- The Minimum Wages Act, 1948
- List of European countries by minimum wage
- List of European Union member states by minimum wage
- List of European countries by average wage
- List of European countries by GNI (nominal) per capita
- List of countries by GDP (nominal)
- List of U.S. states and territories by median wage and mean wage
