= List of U.S. states and territories by poverty rate =

Percent of Americans living below the poverty line in each U.S. state, and the District of Columbia. U.S. Census Bureau.

This list of U.S. states and territories by poverty rate covers the 50 U.S. states, the District of Columbia, and the territory of Puerto Rico. Referenced data for the four other inhabited U.S. territories (American Samoa, Guam, the Northern Mariana Islands, and the U.S. Virgin Islands) has not been found so far.

The data source for the main list is the American Community Survey done by the U.S. Census Bureau. The American Community Survey is a large demographic survey collected throughout the year using mailed questionnaires, telephone interviews, and visits from Census Bureau field representatives to about 3.5 million household addresses annually, regardless of their legal immigration status.

Overall, out of Americans for whom the Census Bureau was able to determine poverty status, 40.8 million lived below the poverty line in 2023 (or 12.5% of the total population). See the table below for the highest poverty rates by state.

== 2023 U.S. Census Bureau table ==
The list is initially sorted by poverty rate but the table headers can be clicked to sort by any column. Links are "Economy of Area" links.

Number and percentage of people in poverty by state, D.C., and Puerto Rico. Plus margin of error. 2023.
Area	Percent	Error (±)	Number	Error (±)
United States	12.5	0.1	40,763,043	277,214
Puerto Rico	39.6	0.8	1,257,607	26,856
Louisiana	18.9	0.6	840,146	27,162
Mississippi	18.0	0.8	512,184	21,949
New Mexico	17.8	0.9	368,669	18,140
West Virginia	16.7	0.7	285,780	11,676
Kentucky	16.4	0.5	720,642	20,801
Oklahoma	15.9	0.4	626,185	15,929
Arkansas	15.7	0.6	466,624	19,172
Alabama	15.6	0.5	773,166	24,550
New York	14.2	0.3	2,702,955	50,606
District of Columbia	14.0	1.6	91,068	10,115
Tennessee	14.0	0.4	978,460	30,784
South Carolina	13.9	0.5	726,799	24,733
Texas	13.7	0.3	4,086,851	75,298
Georgia	13.6	0.4	1,461,317	38,018
Michigan	13.5	0.3	1,326,740	27,989
Ohio	13.3	0.3	1,527,904	36,156
North Carolina	12.8	0.4	1,349,302	38,975
Arizona	12.4	0.4	905,418	32,734
Florida	12.3	0.3	2,729,519	62,129
Indiana	12.3	0.4	821,401	24,875
Oregon	12.2	0.4	506,544	17,185
California	12.0	0.2	4,588,687	71,646
Missouri	12.0	0.4	720,210	24,684
Nevada	12.0	0.7	377,506	20,633
Pennsylvania	12.0	0.3	1,500,959	35,821
South Dakota	11.8	1.0	104,684	8,555
Montana	11.7	0.7	129,804	7,386
Illinois	11.6	0.2	1,426,517	30,335
Iowa	11.3	0.5	351,224	14,199
Wyoming	11.3	1.1	64,309	6,371
Kansas	11.2	0.5	319,652	14,831
Rhode Island	10.8	1.0	114,412	10,758
Wisconsin	10.7	0.3	616,874	19,150
Delaware	10.5	1.0	106,027	10,289
Nebraska	10.5	0.7	202,078	12,736
Alaska	10.4	0.8	74,353	5,930
Maine	10.4	0.6	140,460	8,588
Massachusetts	10.4	0.4	706,730	24,578
Connecticut	10.3	0.5	362,024	17,748
Washington	10.3	0.3	794,426	26,113
Virginia	10.2	0.3	864,394	26,897
Hawaii	10.1	0.7	141,925	10,218
Idaho	10.1	0.7	193,635	12,891
North Dakota	9.8	0.7	73,841	5,342
New Jersey	9.7	0.3	886,772	27,839
Vermont	9.7	0.8	60,413	4,904
Maryland	9.5	0.3	574,160	20,592
Colorado	9.3	0.4	536,507	22,964
Minnesota	9.3	0.3	520,602	17,281
Utah	9.0	0.5	304,249	15,931
New Hampshire	7.2	0.6	97,935	8,712

== 2016-2020 county map ==
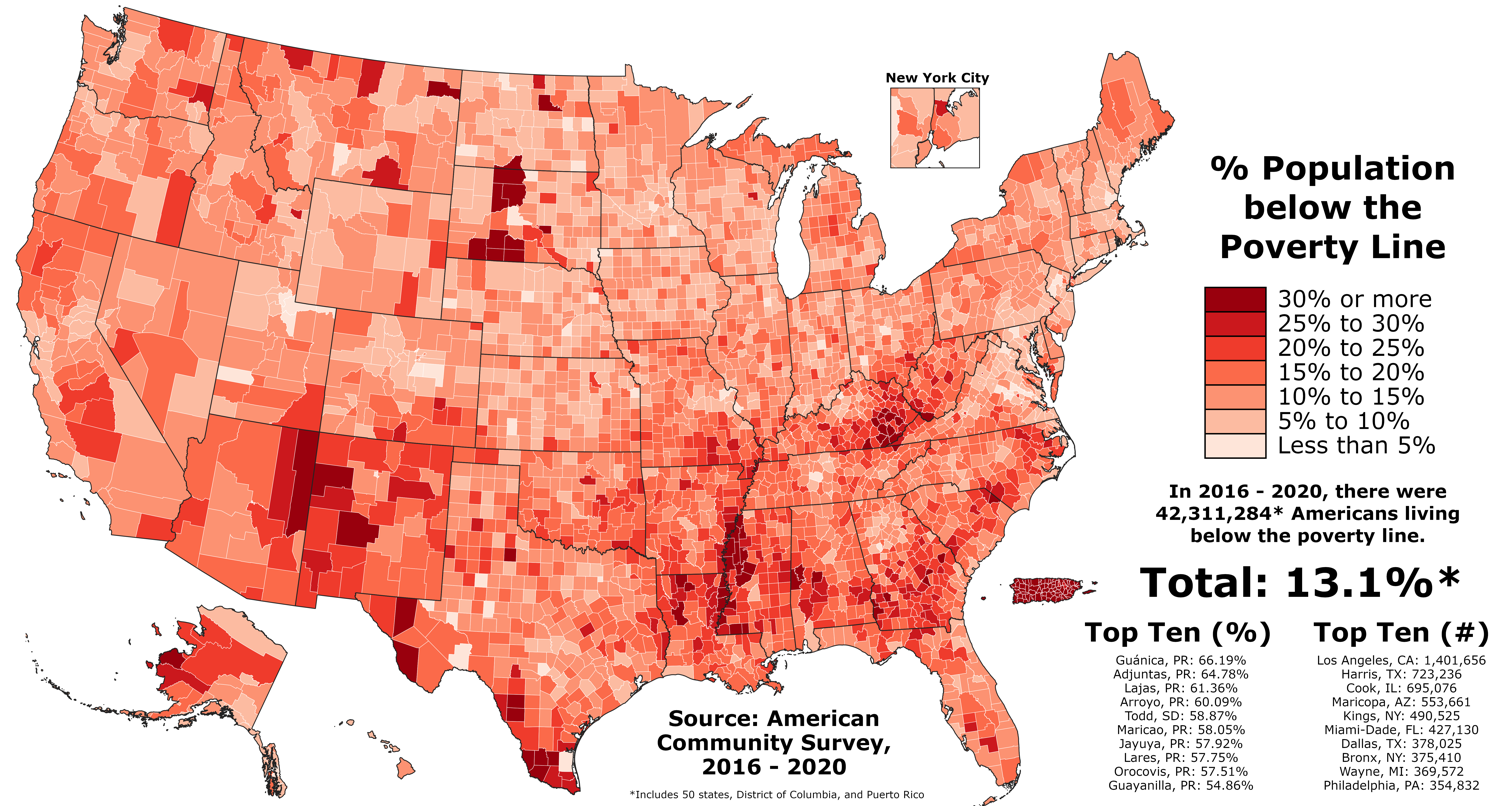
Percent of Americans living below the poverty line in each county of the fifty states, the District of Columbia, and Puerto Rico according to the 2016 - 2020 American Community Survey from the U.S. Census Bureau.

== See also ==
- List of U.S. states and territories by income inequality
- List of lowest-income places in the United States
- List of lowest-income counties in the United States
- Thank God for Mississippi
