= List of U.S. states by adjusted per capita personal income (2022) =

List of states by adjusted per capita personal income estimates the per capita personal income of residents of U.S. states adjusted by differences in the cost of living, called "regional price parities" by the U.S. Bureau of Economic Analysis. The BEA defines regional price parities as an estimate of "the differences in price levels across states and metropolitan areas for a given year and are expressed as a percentage of the overall national price level." The BEA defines personal income as follows:

Personal income is the income received by, or on behalf of, all persons from all sources: from participation as laborers in production, from owning a home or business, from the ownership of financial assets, and from government and business in the form of transfers. It includes income from domestic sources as well as the rest of world. It does not include realized or unrealized capital gains or losses. Personal income is estimated before the deduction of personal income taxes and other personal taxes and is reported in current dollars (no adjustment is made for price changes).

Per Capita Personal Income (PCPI) is a more inclusive estimate of the average standard of living of citizens and residents in the U.S. than measures of per capita income. PCPI "includes wages, benefits, proprietor income, dividends, interest, rent, and transfer payments" such as Social Security, veteran's benefits, farm subsidies, welfare, and food stamps.

The differences in estimates of per capita income and per capita personal income is large. In 2019, the U.S. Census Bureau calculated a per capita income of the United States as 34,103 dollars. The U.S. Bureau of Economic Analysis calculated the PCPI as 56,490 dollars.

A more valid accounting of the differences in the standard of living of American citizens in different states requires recognition that prices vary from state to state and community to community. In general, a dollar has more purchasing power in the poorer states than it does in the richer states. The difference in housing costs from state to state is especially important. The Bureau of Economic Analysis has calculated that the regional price parity of U.S. states ranges from 84.4 in Mississippi (the cheapest state in which to live) to Hawaii at 119.3 (the most expensive state). In other words, an income of $0.84 in Mississippi equals an income of $1.19 in Hawaii with the U.S as a whole having an average PCPI of $1.00. To put it another way, the purchasing power of a dollar is $1.18 in Mississippi and $0.84 in Hawaii. The net impact of accounting for differences in the purchasing power of a dollar in different states is to narrow the gap in the standard of living between rich and poor states.

== Ranking states by PCPI, adjusted by regional price parity ==
Data in this table are from the Bureau of Economic Analysis (BEA) and are for the year 2022. Adjusted personal income is found by dividing personal income by price parity.

Location	PCPI	Price parity	PCPI adj.
United States	65,470	$1.00	65,470
District of Columbia	95,970	$1.13	85,044
Wyoming	73,248	$0.92	79,701
North Dakota	70,360	$0.89	79,363
Connecticut	82,938	$1.06	77,940
South Dakota	68,176	$0.88	77,481
Massachusetts	84,561	$1.09	77,300
Colorado	75,722	$1.02	74,025
Nebraska	64,268	$0.90	71,563
New Jersey	77,199	$1.09	70,983
Minnesota	68,840	$0.98	70,445
New York	75,407	$1.08	70,082
New Hampshire	73,910	$1.08	68,662
Washington	75,332	$1.10	68,578
California	77,036	$1.12	68,495
Iowa	60,222	$0.88	68,107
Montana	60,984	$0.90	67,560
Virginia	68,985	$1.02	67,542
Alaska	68,635	$1.02	67,296
Kansas	60,424	$0.90	67,167
Pennsylvania	64,506	$0.96	67,042
Maryland	70,228	$1.05	66,911
Illinois	67,655	$1.01	66,815
Wisconsin	61,475	$0.92	66,596
Delaware	63,243	$0.98	64,562
Nevada	62,085	$0.96	64,415
Texas	62,586	$0.98	64,183
Indiana	58,323	$0.92	63,521
Tennessee	58,292	$0.92	63,501
Missouri	57,818	$0.91	63,453
Florida	64,806	$1.02	63,446
Oklahoma	56,298	$0.89	63,419
Ohio	57,777	$0.91	63,179
Utah	59,457	$0.94	62,937
Vermont	63,039	$1.01	62,356
North Carolina	58,109	$0.94	61,684
Idaho	56,614	$0.92	61,653
Michigan	57,038	$0.93	61,050
Arkansas	52,618	$0.87	60,762
Rhode Island	63,557	$1.05	60,704
Louisiana	54,501	$0.91	60,176
Maine	60,599	$1.01	60,095
Georgia	56,589	$0.96	59,050
Arizona	58,442	$1.00	58,502
Oregon	62,303	$1.07	58,465
Kentucky	51,921	$0.89	58,106
Alabama	50,916	$0.88	58,007
New Mexico	52,194	$0.91	57,368
South Carolina	53,618	$0.94	57,314
West Virginia	49,993	$0.89	56,018
Hawaii	61,779	$1.11	55,738
Mississippi	46,370	$0.87	53,099
