= Economy of New York =

Economy of New York may refer to:

- Economy of New York City
- Economy of New York (state)
