= List of Oklahoma counties by per capita income =

Oklahoma is the 37th-richest state in the United States, with a per capita income of $32,210 in 2006 and the third fastest-growing per capita income in the United States. Oklahoma also has one of the lowest costs of living in the United States, making its relative per capita income levels much higher than its ranking among states.

== Oklahoma counties ranked by per capita income ==
Note: Data is from the 2010 United States Census Data and the 2006-2010 American Community Survey 5-Year Estimates.

Rank	County	Per capita income	Median household income	Median family income	Population	Number of households
1	Roger Mills	$28,427	$48,917	$57,738	3,647	1,470
	United States	$27,334	$51,914	$62,982	308,745,538	116,716,292
2	Canadian	$26,970	$60,489	$67,981	115,541	42,434
3	Tulsa	$26,769	$45,613	$58,820	603,403	241,737
4	Washington	$26,663	$44,823	$55,272	50,976	21,036
5	Cleveland	$25,831	$52,688	$65,646	255,755	98,306
6	Oklahoma County	$25,723	$42,916	$54,724	718,633	287,598
7	Rogers	$25,358	$57,443	$65,861	86,905	31,884
8	Logan	$25,090	$48,683	$62,229	41,848	15,290
9	Major	$24,897	$46,748	$55,172	7,527	3,109
10	Woodward	$24,635	$49,672	$56,540	20,081	7,654
11	Woods	$24,292	$48,076	$59,252	8,878	3,533
12	Wagoner	$24,049	$55,487	$61,694	73,085	26,878
13	Ellis	$23,767	$43,032	$54,113	4,151	1,782
14	Harper	$23,693	$39,946	$52,891	3,685	1,527
15	McClain	$23,556	$53,708	$63,796	34,506	12,891
16	Beaver	$23,525	$49,743	$55,694	5,636	2,192
17	Kingfisher	$23,481	$49,104	$56,832	15,034	5,731
	Oklahoma State	$23,094	$42,979	$53,607	3,751,351	1,460,450
18	Garfield	$22,812	$40,636	$50,152	60,580	24,175
19	Stephens	$22,790	$43,524	$54,908	45,048	18,127
20	Grant	$22,204	$42,043	$52,153	4,527	1,910
21	Custer	$22,003	$42,108	$52,428	27,469	10,698
22	Creek	$21,891	$42,314	$51,242	69,967	26,539
23	Grady	$21,687	$45,260	$52,889	52,431	19,892
24	Washita	$21,511	$43,039	$53,143	11,629	4,599
25	Osage	$21,446	$41,125	$51,292	47,472	18,205
26	Texas	$21,356	$44,623	$57,434	20,640	7,212
27	Jackson	$21,249	$41,437	$51,840	26,446	10,247
28	Kay	$21,167	$39,505	$49,821	46,562	18,577
29	Beckham	$21,144	$43,642	$52,988	22,119	8,163
30	Pontotoc	$21,136	$37,484	$48,494	37,492	14,654
31	Dewey	$21,055	$39,940	$48,447	4,810	1,944
32	Alfalfa	$21,029	$42,500	$55,903	5,642	2,022
33	Cotton	$20,948	$44,144	$50,486	6,193	2,483
34	Love	$20,817	$41,629	$49,281	9,423	3,713
35	Comanche	$20,778	$44,012	$50,448	124,098	44,982
36	Lincoln	$20,774	$42,282	$51,586	34,273	13,243
37	Nowata	$20,752	$37,500	$48,710	10,536	4,224
38	Pittsburg	$20,714	$39,245	$49,298	45,837	18,012
39	Murray	$20,634	$40,870	$46,929	13,488	5,350
40	Latimer	$20,353	$42,639	$48,817	11,154	4,208
41	Carter	$20,192	$38,385	$49,659	47,557	18,635
42	Garvin	$20,176	$37,785	$45,431	27,576	11,069
43	Delaware	$20,142	$34,383	$41,731	41,487	17,093
44	Noble	$20,032	$39,515	$51,311	11,561	4,614
45	Mayes	$19,975	$41,228	$50,745	41,259	16,008
46	Payne	$19,540	$34,752	$54,394	77,350	30,177
47	Pawnee	$19,520	$40,059	$46,800	16,577	6,486
48	Blaine	$19,445	$41,421	$56,681	11,943	3,959
49	Pottawatomie	$19,437	$40,085	$49,517	69,442	25,911
50	Muskogee	$19,161	$37,002	$46,818	70,990	27,054
51	Bryan	$19,103	$37,230	$44,936	42,416	16,838
52	Okmulgee	$19,071	$37,820	$46,833	40,069	15,362
53	Kiowa	$18,921	$32,565	$43,884	9,446	3,978
54	Marshall	$18,794	$40,419	$48,382	15,840	6,338
55	Craig	$18,784	$39,836	$47,500	15,029	5,691
56	Haskell	$18,735	$37,474	$48,625	12,769	5,044
57	Johnston	$18,451	$34,556	$39,054	10,957	4,312
58	Cimarron	$18,358	$34,096	$39,700	2,475	1,047
59	Hughes	$18,083	$32,677	$41,696	14,003	5,050
60	Sequoyah	$18,049	$36,357	$43,069	42,391	16,208
61	Harmon	$17,677	$31,679	$37,750	2,922	1,112
62	Ottawa	$17,638	$35,483	$42,616	31,848	12,345
63	Jefferson	$17,491	$32,750	$41,042	6,472	2,634
64	McCurtain	$17,456	$31,082	$42,404	33,151	12,958
65	Le Flore	$17,357	$36,335	$43,536	50,384	18,878
66	Coal	$17,338	$31,764	$41,380	5,925	2,350
67	Choctaw	$17,231	$27,549	$36,478	15,205	6,270
68	Seminole	$17,032	$32,985	$43,174	25,482	9,750
69	Caddo	$16,787	$36,413	$43,365	29,600	10,645
70	McIntosh	$16,095	$30,620	$36,572	20,252	8,460
71	Cherokee	$16,084	$32,322	$40,942	46,987	17,836
72	Tillman	$15,894	$29,832	$39,177	7,992	3,216
73	Atoka	$15,772	$31,179	$42,519	14,182	5,391
74	Pushmataha	$15,460	$26,742	$37,500	11,572	4,809
75	Okfuskee	$15,046	$33,286	$42,130	12,191	4,354
76	Adair	$13,732	$29,811	$36,372	22,683	8,156
77	Greer	$13,241	$35,096	$42,007	6,239	2,181
