= EDealinfo USA =

American e-commerce company

eDealinfo USA Inc.
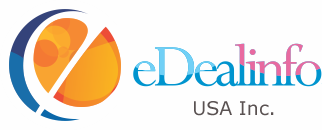
- Website type: Online Service
- Available in: English
- Founded: 2000
- Headquarters: Indiana, U.S.
- Founder: Rajiv Maheshwari
- Industry: Comparison shopping website
- Website: www.edealinfo.com
- Current status: Active

eDealinfo USA Inc. is in e-Commerce business of online deals and coupons for various consumer products and services. The company is headquartered in Indiana, U.S.. eDealinfo USA Inc. operates its business through various domain names.

== History ==
In 2000, Rajiv Maheshwari launched a pilot version on a sub-domain of a hosting site. In December 2000, the edealinfo.com domain was purchased and the entire site moved there. Later two more websites were launched that were focused on coupons and computer system deals.

Initially the company was located in the Detroit suburbs of Michigan. In 2015, Michigan passed the Sales and Use Tax Click-Through nexus law and the company relocated to Indiana to avoid termination of affiliate contracts with various online retailers.

In 2017, ecouponsinfo.com was merged back with edealinfo.com. A further website unboxcoupons.com was launched with focus on coupons and vouchers for merchants outside of the United States.

== Recognition ==
eDealinfo.com was listed in the "20+ tools for price watching and protecting" by CNET, in the "5 Things You Need to Know Before Using a Deals Website" by CheatSheet and was mentioned in 'Marketing your Udemy Course' by Udemy. The site was also mentioned in the books "USA" by Jeff Campbell and "Worry-free Family Finances" by Bill Staton and Mary Staton.

== Products and services ==
The company displays deals and coupons from online retailers worldwide for various products daily for different brands and product categories.
