= Economy of Connecticut =

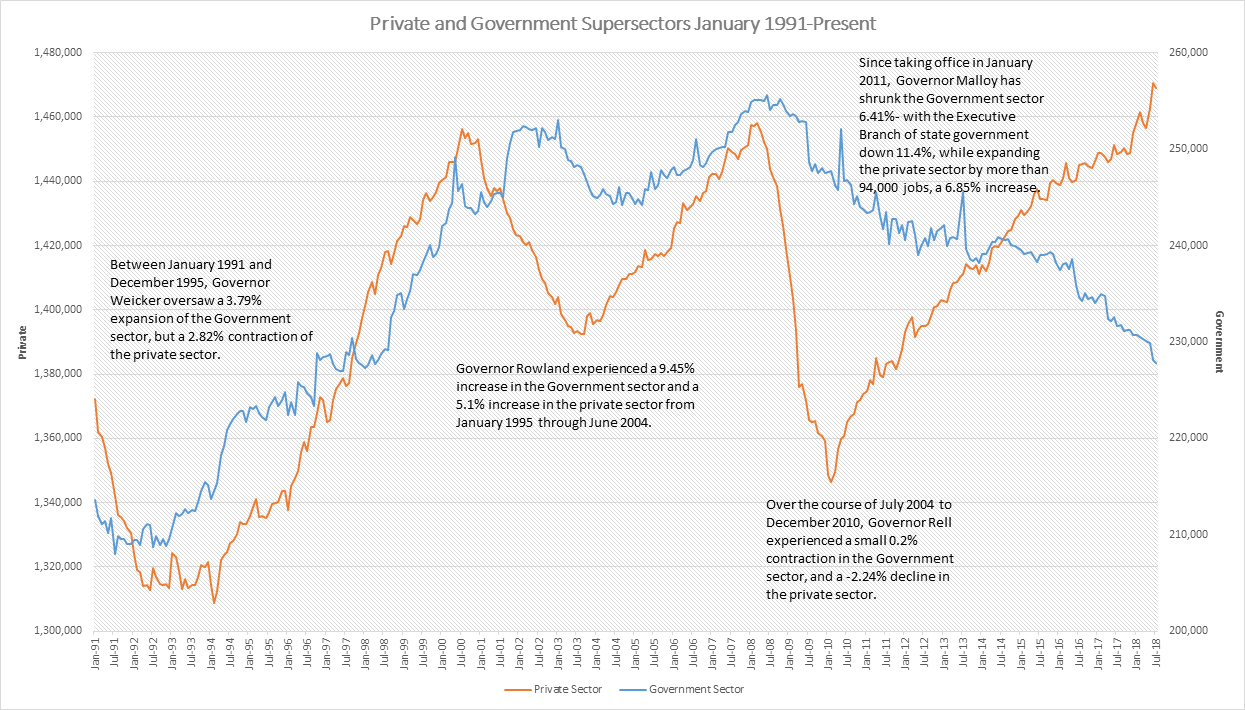
Graph of private and public sector jobs in Connecticut, 1991-2018

The total gross state product for Connecticut for 2023 was $345.9 billion, up from $321.7 billion in 2022.

Connecticut's adjusted per capita personal income in 2022 was estimated at $77,940, third-highest among states. There is a large disparity in incomes throughout the state; Connecticut was tied with California and Massachusetts for the second highest (after New York's 0.52) Gini coefficient, at 0.50, as of 2020. According to a 2018 study by Phoenix Marketing International, Connecticut had the third-largest number of millionaires per capita in the United States, with a ratio of 7.75%. New Canaan is the wealthiest town in Connecticut, with a per capita income of $105,846. Hartford is the poorest municipality in Connecticut, with a per capita income of $16,798 in 2020. At the county level, per capita income ranged from $48,295 in Fairfield County to $26,585 in Windham County, which is close to the United States average.

As of December 2019, Connecticut's seasonally adjusted unemployment rate was 3.8%, with U.S. unemployment at 3.5% that month. Dating back to 1982, Connecticut recorded its lowest unemployment in 2000 between August and October, at 2.2%. The highest unemployment rate during that period occurred in November and December 2010 at 9.3%, but economists expected record new levels of layoffs as a result of business closures in the spring of 2020 due to the coronavirus pandemic.

== Industries ==
Finance and insurance is Connecticut's largest industry, according to the U.S. Census Bureau, generating 16.4% of gross domestic product (GDP) in 2009. Major financial industry employers include The Hartford, Travelers, Cigna, Aetna, Mass Mutual, People's United Financial, Royal Bank of Scotland, UBS, Bridgewater Associates, and GE Capital. Separately, the real estate industry accounted for an additional 15% of economic activity in 2009, with major employers including Realogy and William Raveis Real Estate.

Manufacturing is the third biggest industry at 11.9% of GDP and dominated by Hartford-based United Technologies Corporation (UTC), which employs more than 22,000 people in Connecticut. Lockheed Martin subsidiary Sikorsky Aircraft operates Connecticut's single largest manufacturing plant in Stratford, where it makes helicopters. Other UTC divisions include UTC Propulsion and Aerospace Systems, including jet engine manufacturer Pratt & Whitney and UTC Building and Industrial Systems.

Other major manufacturers include the Electric Boat division of General Dynamics, which makes submarines in Groton, and Boehringer Ingelheim, a pharmaceuticals manufacturer with its U.S. headquarters in Ridgefield.

Connecticut historically was a center of gun manufacturing, and four gun-manufacturing firms continued to operate in the state as of December 2012, employing 2,000 people: Colt, Stag, Ruger, and Mossberg. Marlin, owned by Remington, closed in April 2011.

A report issued by the Connecticut Commission on Culture & Tourism on December 7, 2006, demonstrated that the areas of the arts, film, history, and tourism generated more than $14 billion in economic activity and 170,000 jobs annually. This provides $9 billion in personal income for Connecticut residents and $1.7 billion in state and local revenue. The Foxwoods Resort Casino and Mohegan Sun casino number among the state's largest employers; both are located on Indian reservations in the eastern part of Connecticut.

Connecticut's agricultural sector employed about 12,000 people as of 2010, with more than a quarter of that number involved in nursery stock production. Other agricultural products include dairy products and eggs, tobacco, fish and shellfish, and fruit.

Oyster harvesting was historically an important source of income to towns along the Connecticut coastline. In the 19th century, oystering boomed in New Haven, Bridgeport, and Norwalk and achieved modest success in neighboring towns.

In 1911, Connecticut's oyster production reached its peak at nearly 25 million pounds of oyster meats. This was, at the time, higher than production in New York, Rhode Island, or Massachusetts. During this time, the Connecticut coast was known in the shellfishing industry as the oyster capital of the world. From before World War 1 until 1969, Connecticut laws restricted the right to harvest oysters in state-owned beds to sailing vessels. These laws prompted the construction of the oyster sloop style vessel that lasted well into the 20th century. The sloop Hope is believed to be the last oyster sloop built in Connecticut, completed in Greenwich in 1948.

== Real estate ==
Of home-sale transactions that closed in March 2014, the median home in Connecticut sold for $225,000, up 3.2% from March 2013. Connecticut ranked ninth nationally in foreclosure activity as of April 2014, with one of every 887 residential units involved in a foreclosure proceeding, or 0.11% of the total housing stock., including City Place I and the Traveler's Tower, both housing the major insurance industry.

== Taxation ==
Before 1991, Connecticut had an investment-only income tax system. Income from employment was untaxed, but income from investments was taxed at 13%, the highest rate in the U.S., with no deductions allowed for costs of producing the investment income, such as interest on borrowing.

In 1991, under Governor Lowell P. Weicker Jr., an independent, the system was changed to one in which the taxes on employment income and investment income were equalized at a maximum rate of 4%. The new tax policy drew investment firms to Connecticut; as of 2014, Fairfield County was home to the headquarters for 14 of the 200 largest hedge funds in the world.

As of 2014, the income tax rates on Connecticut individuals are divided into six tax brackets of 3% (on income up to $10,000); 5% ($10,000-$50,000); 5.5% ($50,000-$100,000); 6% ($100,000-$200,000); 6.5% ($200,000-$250,000); and 6.7% (more than $250,000), with additional amounts owed depending on the bracket.

All wages of Connecticut residents are subject to the state's income tax, even if earned outside the state. However, in those cases, Connecticut income tax must be withheld only to the extent the Connecticut tax exceeds the amount withheld by the other jurisdiction. Since New York and Massachusetts have higher tax rates than Connecticut, this effectively means that Connecticut residents that work in those states have no Connecticut income tax withheld. Connecticut permits a credit for taxes paid to other jurisdictions, but since residents who work in other states are still subject to Connecticut income taxation, they may owe taxes if the jurisdictional credit does not fully offset the Connecticut tax amount.

Connecticut levies a 6.35% state sales tax on the retail sale, lease, or rental of most goods. Some items and services in general are not subject to sales and use taxes unless specifically enumerated as taxable by statute. A provision excluding clothing under $50 from sales tax was repealed as of July 1, 2011. There are no additional sales taxes imposed by local jurisdictions. In August 2013, Connecticut authorized a sales tax "holiday" for one week during which retailers did not have to remit sales tax on certain items and quantities of clothing.

All real and personal property located within the state of Connecticut is taxable unless specifically exempted by statute. All assessments are at 70% of fair market value. Another 20% of the value may be taxed by the local government though. The maximum property tax credit is $300 per return and any excess may not be refunded or carried forward. Connecticut does not levy an intangible personal property tax. According to the Tax Foundation, the 2010 Census data shows Connecticut residents paying the 2nd highest average property taxes in the nation with only New Jersey ahead of them.

The Tax Foundation determined Connecticut residents had the third highest burden in the nation for state and local taxes at 11.86%, or $7,150, compared to the national average of 9.8%.

As of 2014, the gasoline tax in Connecticut is 49.3 cents per gallon (the third highest in the nation) and the diesel tax is 54.9 cents per gallon (the highest in the nation).
