= Economy of Oklahoma =

- Flag of Oklahoma
- Currency: US$ (USD)
- Fiscal year: July 1 - June 30

Statistics
- Population: 3.9 million
- GDP: $200.2 billion (nominal, Q1 2020)
- GDP rank: ▼30th (Q1 2020)
- GDP growth: ▼4.0% (2020)
- GDP per capita: $50,594 (2020 est)
- GDP by sector: Agriculture 2% Industry 34% Services 64%
- Population below national poverty line: 15.2% (2011)
- Labor force: ▲1.9 million (Q1 2020)
- Labor force by occupation: Agriculture 1% Industry 16% Services 83%
- Unemployment: ▲5.7% (Q3 2020)
- Average gross salary: $45,620 (Q2 2019)

External
- Exports: ▼$5.4 billion (2020)
- Export goods: Aircraft engines, motor vehicles, precious metals, pork meat
- Main export partners: Canada 27% Mexico 9% Germany 9% Japan 5%
- Imports: ▼$10.8 billion (2020)
- Import goods: Crude Oil, turbojets, computers
- Main import partners: Canada 40% China 22% Mexico 7% Germany 4%

Public finance
- Government debt: ▲$2.1 billion; 1% of GDP (2020)
- Revenue: $19.8 (FY2020) (Taxation 49.3%, Federal Grants 38.9%, Other 11.8%)
- Spending: $19.8 billion (FY2014) (Health Services 31.3 %, Education 26.1%, Social Services 12.4%, Gov't Admin 10.9%, Public Safety 4.6%, Debt Service 1.4%, Other 13.3%)
- Credit rating: Standard & Poor's: AA; Moody's: Aa2; Fitch: AA
- All values, unless otherwise stated, are in US dollars.

The economy of Oklahoma is the 30th largest in the United States. Oklahoma's gross state product (GSP) is approximately $197.2 billion as of December 2018.

== Data ==
=== Historical data ===
The history of Oklahoma's GSP according to the Bureau of Economic Analysis and the United States Census Bureau

Year	Nominal GSP (in bil. US-Dollar)	GSP growth (in percent)	Population (in thousands)	Population growth (in percent)	GSP per capita (in US Dollars)	Unemployment (in percent)	State Government spending (in % of GSP)	State Government debt (in % of GSP)	Current account balance (in % of GSP)
2020	▼185.9	▼ -8.0	▲3,981	▲0.6	▼46,697	▲4.7	▲10.7	▲4.6	▼ -2.9
2019	▲201.3	▲1.7	▲3,957	▲0.4	▲51,049	▼3.0	▲8.2	▼4.1	▼ -2.8
2018	▲198.6	▲7.1	▲3,940	▲0.2	▲50,406	▼3.2	▼8.8	▼4.2	▼ -2.6
2017	▲185.5	▲0.7	▲3,931	▲0.1	▲47,189	▼3.8	▼9.4	▲4.3	▼ -2.3
2016	▼177.8	▼ -3.4	▲3,926	▲0.4	▼45,288	▲4.5	▲10.1	▲4.2	
2015	▼184.1	▼ -4.9	▲3,910	▲0.8	▲47,084	▼4.4	▲9.5	▲4.1	
2014	▲193.5	▲6.4	▲3,878	▲0.6	▲49,897	5.0	▼9.0	▼3.4	
2013	▲181.9	▲5.0	▲3,853	▲0.9	▲47,210	▼5.0	▼9.3	▼3.5	
2012	▲173.2	▲4.9	▲3,819	▲0.8	▲45,352	▼5.1	▼9.6	▼3.9	
2011	▲165.1	▲7.8	▲3,788	▲1.7	▲43,585	▼5.4	▼10.1	▲4.3	
2010	▼153.2	▼ -4.1	▲3,724	▲1.0	▼41,139	▼6.1	▲10.8		
2009	159.8	0.0	▲3,686	▲1.3	▼43,353	▲7.0	▲10.1		
2008	▲159.8	▲10.4	▲3,640	▲0.9	▲43,901	▲4.7	▼9.4		
2007	▲144.8	▲5.8	▲3,609	▲1.4	▲40,122	▼3.6	▲9.7		

=== GSP by industry ===
Industries value added to Oklahoma GDP in Q1 2020. Sectors percentages are compared to sector percentages of United States GDP.

Sector	OK value ($ billions)	Sector % of OK GDP	Sector % of US GDP
Agriculture ^{a}	4.4	2.2%	1%
Mining ^{b}	45.0	22.5%	3%
Construction ^{c}	5.6	2.8%	2%
Manufacturing ^{d}	16.6	8.3%	4%
Trade, Transportation, and Utilities ^{e}	35.8	17.9%	12%
Information ^{f}	5.2	2.6%	5%
Finance ^{g}	22.0	11.0%	20%
Professional ^{h}	16.4	8.2%	12%
Education and Health ^{i}	14.0	7.0%	8%
Entertainment ^{j}	5.4	2.7%	4%
Other Services ^{k}	3.4	1.7%	2%
Government ^{l}	27.8	13.9%	12%
Total	200.2	100%	100%

== Employment ==
There were approximately 1.8 million in the Oklahoma labor force in 2018. The private sector employs 90% of working Oklahomans, with the government (federal, state, and local) employing 9%. The largest employer in the state is the United States Department of Defense, which employs approximately 69,000 workers or 3.8% of all working Oklahomans. The largest private employer is Walmart, which employs approximately 32,000 workers or 1.8% of all working Oklahomans.

As of 2019, the top 20 employers in the State of Oklahoma were:

#	Employer	# of employees
1	United States Department of Defense	69,000
2	Walmart	32,200
3	University of Oklahoma	17,800
4	Chickasaw Nation	11,300
5	Choctaw Nation of Oklahoma	10,000
6	Integris Health	8,900
7	Cherokee Nation	8,500
8	Oklahoma State University	8,200
9	United States Postal Service	6,900
10	Oklahoma Department of Human Services	6,600
11	Hobby Lobby	6,401
12	Mercy Health	6,300
13	Saint Francis Hospitals	6,200
14	Tulsa Public Schools	5,900
15	United States Department of Veterans Affairs	5,800
16	Braum's	5,400
17	American Airlines	5,200
18	Lowe's	5,100
19	Oklahoma City Public Schools	5,000
20	City of Oklahoma City	4,800

== See also ==
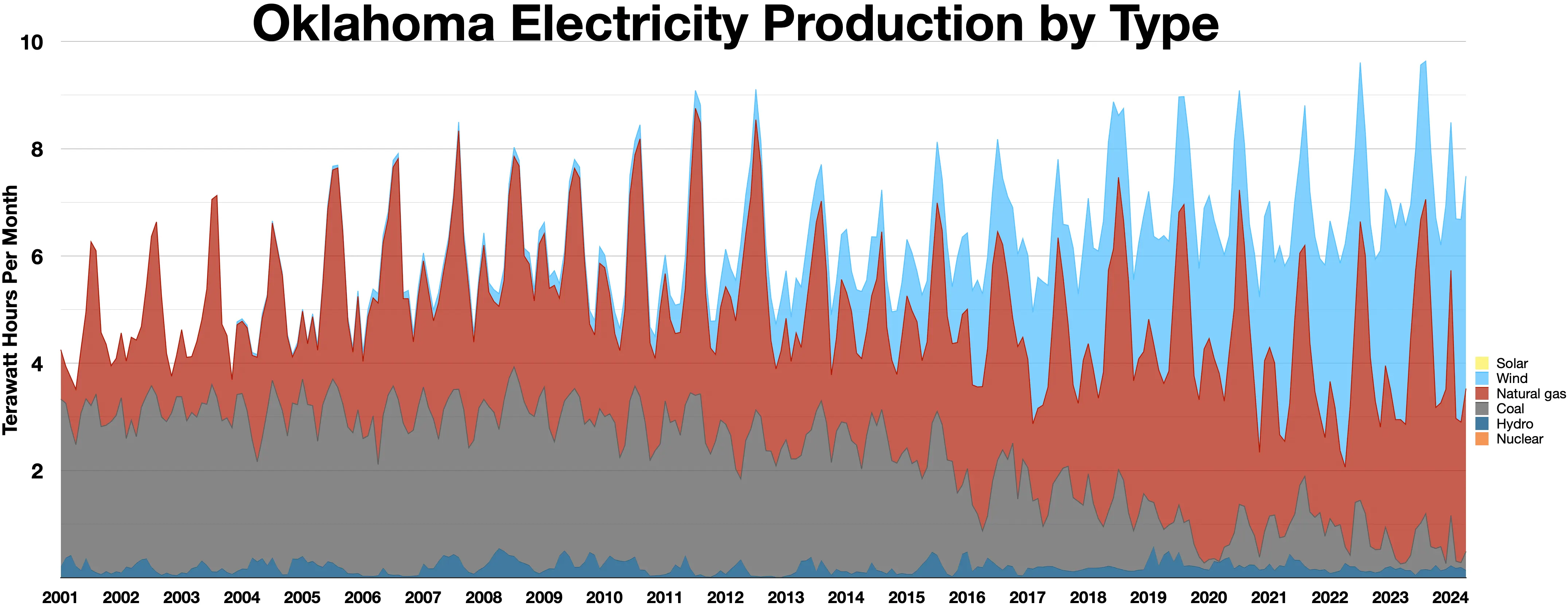
Oklahoma electricity production by type

- List of US state economies
- List of Oklahoma counties by per capita income
- List of Oklahoma counties by socioeconomic factors

== Notes ==
- ^a Agriculture Sector includes establishments primarily engaged in growing crops, raising animals, harvesting timber, harvesting fish and other animals from a farm, ranch or their natural habitats
- ^b Mining Sector includes exploration and development of minerals, including solids such as coal and ores, liquids such as crude petroleum, and gases such as natural gas
- ^c Construction Sector comprises establishments primarily engaged in the construction of buildings or engineering projects
- ^dManufacturing Sector includes establishments engaged in the mechanical, physical, or chemical transformation of materials, substances, or components into new products
- ^eTrade, Transportation, and Utitlies Sector includes wholesaling of merchandise, retailing of merchandise, passenger and freight transit, storage and warehousing of goods, and public utilities services
- ^fInformation Sector concerns publishing industries, including software publishing, motion picture and sound publishing, broadcast industries, telecommunications, and Internet service providers
- ^gFinance Sector comprises establishment engaged in financial transactions, including banking, securities, insurance, and investment advisory services
- ^hProfessional Sector comprises establishments that specialize in performing professional, scientific, and technical activities for others
- ^iEducation and Healthcare Sector comprises schools, colleges, universities, and training centers as well as establishments providing health care and social assistance for individuals
- ^jEntertainment Sector includes establishments that operate facilities or provide services to meet varied cultural, entertainment, and recreational interests of their patrons, such as live performances, historical exhibits, and recreationally facilities
- ^kThe Other Sector includes establishments which provide services not specifically provided for elsewhere in the classification system
- ^lGovernment Sector includes the executive, legislative, judicial, administrative, regulatory, and military activities of Federal, state, and local governments together with government owned enterprises
