= Economy of Indiana =

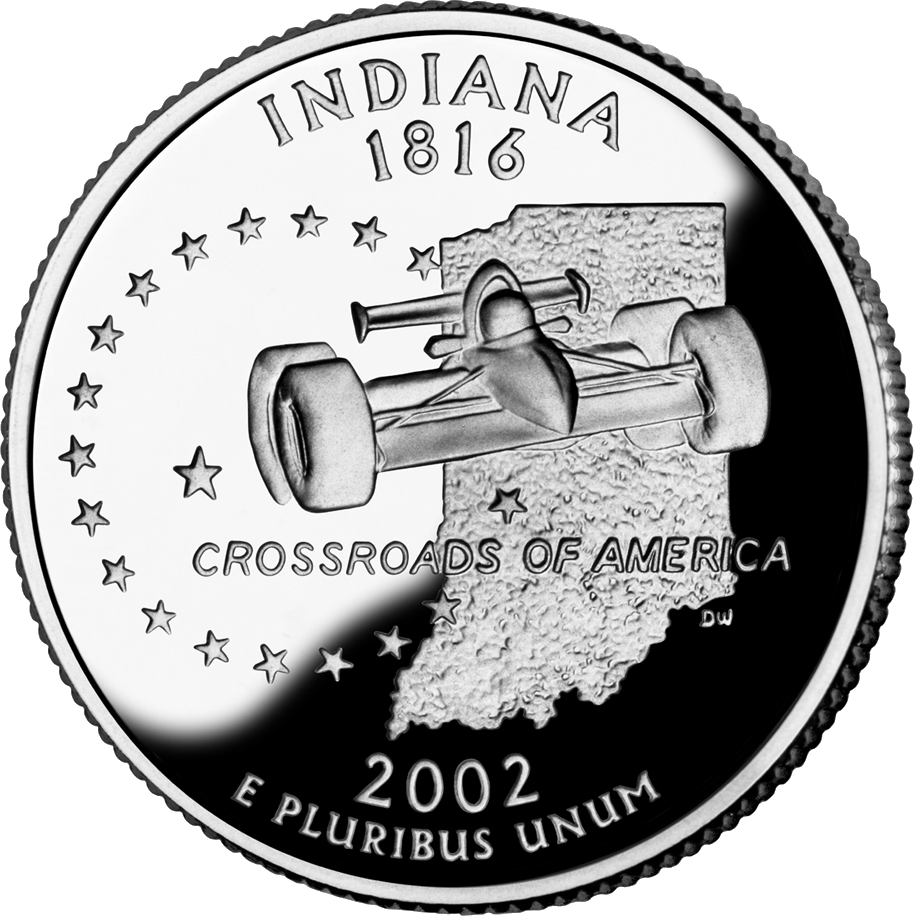
- Indiana State Quarter

Statistics
- GDP: $519,516.5 million
- GDP per capita: $43,492
- Population below poverty line: 13.1%
- Gini coefficient: 0.434
- Labor force: 3,144,700
- Unemployment: 3.9%

Public finances
- Revenues: $13,796.427 million
- Expenses: $13,036 million

The economy of the state of Indiana is reflected in its gross state product in 2017 of US$359 billion and per capita income of $44,165. A high percentage of Indiana's income is from manufacturing. Indiana has been the largest steel producing state in the U.S. since 1975, with the Calumet Region of northwest Indiana being the largest single steel producing area in the U.S., accounting for 27% of all U.S. steel production. Indiana is also the 2nd largest auto manufacturing state. Indiana's other manufactures include pharmaceuticals and medical devices, automobiles, electrical equipment, transportation equipment, chemical products, rubber, petroleum and coal products, and factory machinery.

== History ==
Indiana's earliest economy revolved around trade with the Native American tribes in the northern and central parts of the state, which were connected by rivers to the Great Lakes, and ultimately the Atlantic Ocean. The state government established a trading monopoly with the tribes who became the primary purchasers of Indiana settler's goods. Although the basis was established in the Northwest Ordinance and well known, economic growth was slow to begin in the state, primarily due to the inability to ship goods to market affordably. After the Mississippi River was opened to American traffic following the Louisiana Purchase, agricultural grew rapidly in the state, but was still hampered by the lack of internal transportation in the state.

The Indiana General Assembly attempted to remedy the transportation system in the late 1810s, but was thwarted by the Panic of 1819 which caused the state's only two banks to collapse. A second attempt was launched in the early 1830s leading to the passage of the Mammoth Internal Improvement Act. This state-funded development of canals, railroads and roads statewide resulted in a large rise in land and produce values, but it too was thwarted by the Panic of 1837; although this spending bankrupted the state, the foundation it provided allowed Indiana to grow into one of the leading farming states by the 1850s.

The 1860s Indiana in the American Civil War rapidly completed the state's railroad system and accelerated the growth of industry. Building railroad cars and glass manufacturing became the state early leading industries, established primarily in the central parts of the state. Southern Indiana, however was adversely affected by the war and never regained its economic dominance in the state. Prior to the war, the largest cities were along the Ohio River and had a thriving trade with the south and large ship building centers that languished in the war. In most of the state, the war led to a rise in the value of farm produce and significantly raised the state's standards of living.

The Indiana Gas Boom began in the 1880s and lasted through 1910, when large-scale drilling and production of natural gas took place in the Trenton Gas Field of east-central Indiana. The Ball Corporation moved its headquarters from New York to Muncie, Indiana and built a glass factory to take advantage of the cheap natural gas, and became an icon of Muncie.

Indiana rapidly became a manufacturing powerhouse in the first 20 years of the 20th Century, as steel, oil refining, automobiles, railroad rolling stock, and consumer and industrial appliance companies established themselves, taking advantage of Indiana's central location, cheap and plentiful land, and the lower costs associated with smaller industrial cities. Enormous integrated steel mills were built in cities like East Chicago and Gary along the shore of Lake Michigan, with smaller mills built in cities like Muncie and Indianapolis. Railroads crisscrossed the state, the most iconic being the Monon Line.

Indiana, being a manufacturing and agricultural state, was utterly devastated by the Great Depression in the 1930s. Unemployment exceeded 25% at the depths of the Depression in early 1933, with many coal-mining southern counties seeing unemployment rates exceed 50%. The Indiana Republican Party, which previously dominated the state and gave precedent to business interests, was destroyed in the elections of 1932, and the Indiana Democrats, led by newly elected governor Paul V. McNutt, swept to power and radically transformed the state, implementing public works projects and completely overhauling the state government. Trade unions gained new strength during the 1935 - 1945 period, and peaked at 41% in 1964. Unions would be a potent political force in Indiana through the 1990s, with a unionization rate of 20% as recently as 1990.

However, Indiana's factories went into overdrive during World War II (1939–1945) to support the Allied and American war efforts. Full employment and prosperity returned. Indiana manufactured 4.5 percent of total United States military armaments produced during World War II, ranking eighth among the 48 states.

During the post-World War II boom from 1945 to 1973, Indiana's economy prospered and Indiana was ranked 20th out of 50 states plus Washington, D.C., in the late-1960s for personal income. However, Indiana's economy began to struggle after the recession of 1969-1970 as the manufacturing sector began to decline. Foreign competition, corporate mergers, automation, and new management strategies lead to downsizing, mass layoffs, diversification, and chronic unemployment. Cities such as Muncie, Anderson, Indianapolis, Kokomo, Gary, East Chicago, Hammond, Michigan City, Fort Wayne, South Bend, Elkhart, and Evansville all witnessed population declines and rising unemployment and poverty during the 1970s and 1980s. Northwest Indiana was hit especially by the steel crisis of 1974 - 1983.

Since the early-1990s, Indiana has diversified its economy away from heavy industry and towards service (such as banking, insurance, healthcare, education, financial services, information technology) and high-tech manufacturing. In 2016, 516,000 workers were employed in manufacturing, down from 696,000 in 2000 and nearly 750,000 in 1969, but up from 424,000 in 2009 at the depths of the Great Recession. Heavy industries such as oil, autos, and steel still comprise a significant portion of the states' GDP, but other industries such as electrical goods, medical equipment, and pharmaceuticals have grown recently as well. However, Indiana's wage growth has lagged behind other states, and Indiana has fallen from 20th in personal income during the 1960s to 39th in 2017.

== Sectors ==
=== Agriculture ===
Indiana is the eighth largest agricultural exporter in the nation, exporting just over $4.6 billion in 2017. Indiana is the tenth largest farming state in the nation. Top 5 commodities (by value of sales)

Corn: $3.28 billion Soybeans: $3.08 billion Meat animals: $1.62 billion Poultry and eggs: $1.18 billion Dairy: $750 million

=== Automotive ===
In 2013, Indiana's automobile industry rose to 2nd place in the country, behind Michigan, in terms of automotive gross domestic product.

=== E-commerce ===
- eDealinfo USA (2000)

=== Energy ===
Sources of electricity (2009) See below Navbox for individual facilities.

Fuel	Capacity	Percent of Total Consumed	Percent of Total Production	Number of Plants/Units
Coal	22,190.5 MW	63%	88.5%	28 Plants
Natural Gas	2,100 MW	29%	10.5%	15 Facilities; *Often used in Peaking Stations
Wind (Currently The fastest growing form of energy in Indiana)	1,036 MW; 1,836.5 MW when all current wind farms are complete	?	?	4 Farms appx 1,000–1,100 Towers total
Coal Gasification	600 MW	?	?	1 Facility under Construction
Petroleum	575 MW	7.5%	1.5%	10 Units
Hydroelectric	64 MW	0.0450%	0.0100%	1 Plant
Biomass	28 MW	0.0150%	0.0020%	1 Facility
Wood & Waste	18 MW	0.0013%	0.0015%	3 Units
Geothermal and/or Solar	0 MW	0.0%	0.0	No Facilities at this time
Nuclear	0 MW	0.0%	0.0	None
Total	22,797.5 MW * only includes top number of wind	100%	100%	46 Generating Facilities

==== Renewable ====
===== Hydro =====
Indiana has six hydroelectric dams. The Norway and Oakdale Dams near Monticello provide electrical power, recreation, and other benefits to local citizens. The Norway Dam created Lake Shafer and the Oakdale Dam created Lake Freeman. The Markland Dam, on the Ohio River, near Vevay, Indiana also produces electricity. The city of Wabash was the first electrically lighted city in the country.

===== Biofuels =====
Indiana is becoming a leading state in the production of biofuels, such as ethanol and biodiesel. Indiana now has 12 ethanol and 4 biodiesel plants located in the state. Reynolds, located north of Lafayette is now known as BioTown, USA. The town is experimenting with using biofuels and organic fuels, such as those made with manure, to power the town.

===== Solar =====
A 17.5MW plant built at the Indianapolis airport in 2013 was the largest airport solar farm in the U.S.

===== Wind =====
Commercial wind power in Indiana began in 2008 when the Benton County Wind Farm came online. New estimates of wind resources in 2006 raised the potential wind power capacity for Indiana from 30 MW at 50 m turbine hub height to 40,000 MW at 70 m, which could double at 100 m, the height of newer turbines. At the end of June, 2008, Indiana had installed 130 MW of wind turbines and had under construction another 400 MW. As of 31 December 2009, Indiana had a total of 1035.95 MW of wind power nameplate capacity installed, with more under construction or in planning.

===== Geothermal =====
As of March 2008 Indiana has no geothermal electrical power generation facility. The Indiana Geological Survey was conducting a study to catalogue all potentially exploitable sources of geothermal heat in the state.

In 2010, the Indiana Heating and Air-Conditioning Incentive Program (IHIP) provides rebates of up to $1000 for the purchase and installation of Energy Star-rated geothermal heat pumps.

One of the largest geothermal heat pump systems in the United States is a GeoExchange pond coupled loop system by Geothermal Design Associates at the St. Joseph Medical Center in Fort Wayne.

=== Mining ===
In mining, Indiana is probably best known for its decorative limestone from the southern, hilly portion of the state, especially from Lawrence County. One of the many public buildings faced with this stone is The Pentagon, and after the September 11, 2001, attacks, a special effort was made by the mining industry of Indiana to replace those damaged walls with as nearly identical type and cut of material as the original facing. There are also large coal mines in the southern portion of the state. Like most Great Lakes states, Indiana has small to medium operating petroleum fields; the principal location of these today is in Southwestern Indiana, though operational oil derricks can be seen on the outskirts of Terre Haute.

=== Pharmaceuticals & medical devices ===
Indiana is home to the international headquarters of pharmaceutical manufacturer Eli Lilly in Indianapolis, the state's largest corporation. Evansville is home to Mead Johnson Nutritionals, a subsidiary of Bristol-Myers Squibb, another large producer. Elkhart has also had a strong economic base of pharmaceuticals, though it has decreased over with the closure of Whitehall Laboratories in the 1990s and of the large Bayer complex, announced in late 2005. Overall, Indiana ranks fifth among all U.S. states in total sales and shipments of pharmaceutical products and second highest in the number of biopharmaceutical related jobs. Warsaw is dubbed the "Orthopedic Capital of the World"; the Warsaw region is home to nearly one-third of the $38 billion global orthopaedic industry including Zimmer, Biomet and DePuy. Other medical device companies include Roche Diagnostics in Indianapolis, and Cook in Bloomington.

== See also ==
- Economy of Indianapolis
- List of U.S. states by GDP (nominal)
- Great Lakes Megalopolis
