= Economy of Colorado =

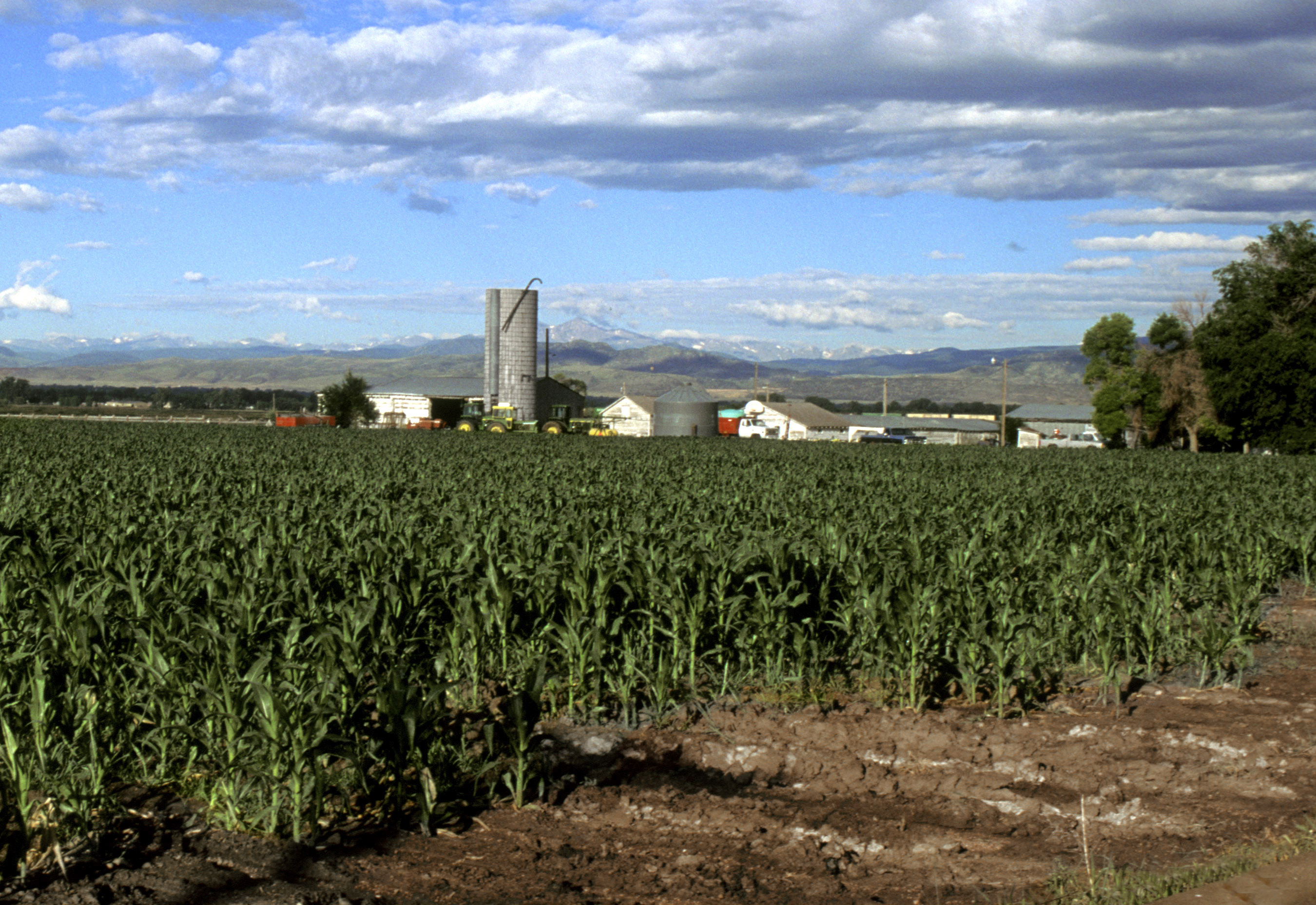
- Corn production in Colorado

Statistics
- GDP: $382.5 billion (2020)
- GDP per capita: $63776
- Population below national poverty line: 13.7%
- Gini coefficient: 0.453
- Labor force: 2,819,800
- Unemployment: 3.0%

Public finance
- Revenue: $8,586 million (2010)
- Spending: $7,722 million

In 2021, the economy of the State of Colorado was 16th largest in the United States with a gross state product of $421 billion. Colorado's per capita personal income in 2019 was $61,157, putting Colorado 12th in the nation.

Wheat, corn, sorghum, and proso millet were the largest agricultural products by acres farmed. Hay ($1 billion), corn ($850 million), and wheat ($460 million) were the largest farmed products by value sold. Colorado is also a significant beef producer with 659,000 cows in 2021. Colorado was the fourth largest marijuana producer in 2021 by sales at $460 million.

The state's economy is diversified and is notable for its concentration of scientific research and high-technology industries. Other industries include food processing, transportation equipment, machinery, chemical products, minerals such as gold and molybdenum, and tourism.

== Federal ==
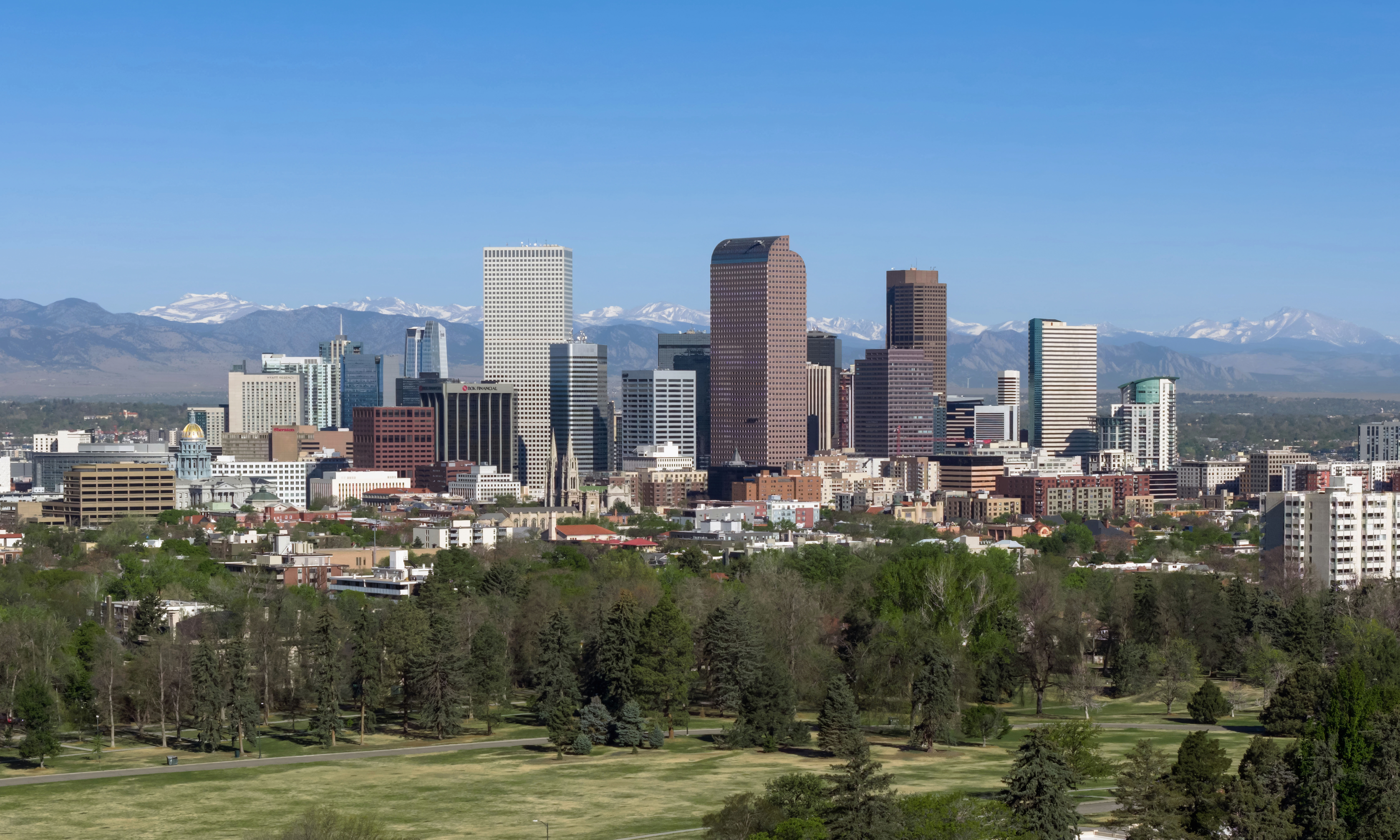
Denver is the economic center of Colorado.

As of August 2013, Colorado had 53,800 nonmilitary federal employees, which made of 2.3 percent of the state's total nonfarm employment, slightly above the national average of 2.0 percent. In addition, there were 37,285 active military in Colorado.

Before Colorado was a state, it was a federal prison territory. Today, the Federal Bureau of Prisons operates the Federal Correctional Complex, in Fremont County, which consists of several separate Federal prisons, including ADX Florence, the only supermax facility in the federal system, home to many convicted terrorists and other notorious criminals.

The North American Aerospace Defense Command (NORAD) and United States Air Force Academy are based in Colorado Springs; National Oceanic and Atmospheric Administration (NOAA), National Center for Atmospheric Research (NCAR) and the National Institute of Standards and Technology in Boulder; United States Geological Survey and other government agencies at the Denver Federal Center in Lakewood; the Denver Mint and United States Court of Appeals for the Tenth Circuit in Denver.

There is also a significant amount of federal lands in the state, including 11 National Forests and four National Parks. There are also numerous private companies that have operations in Colorado that deal with the governmental agencies in states.

== State taxes ==
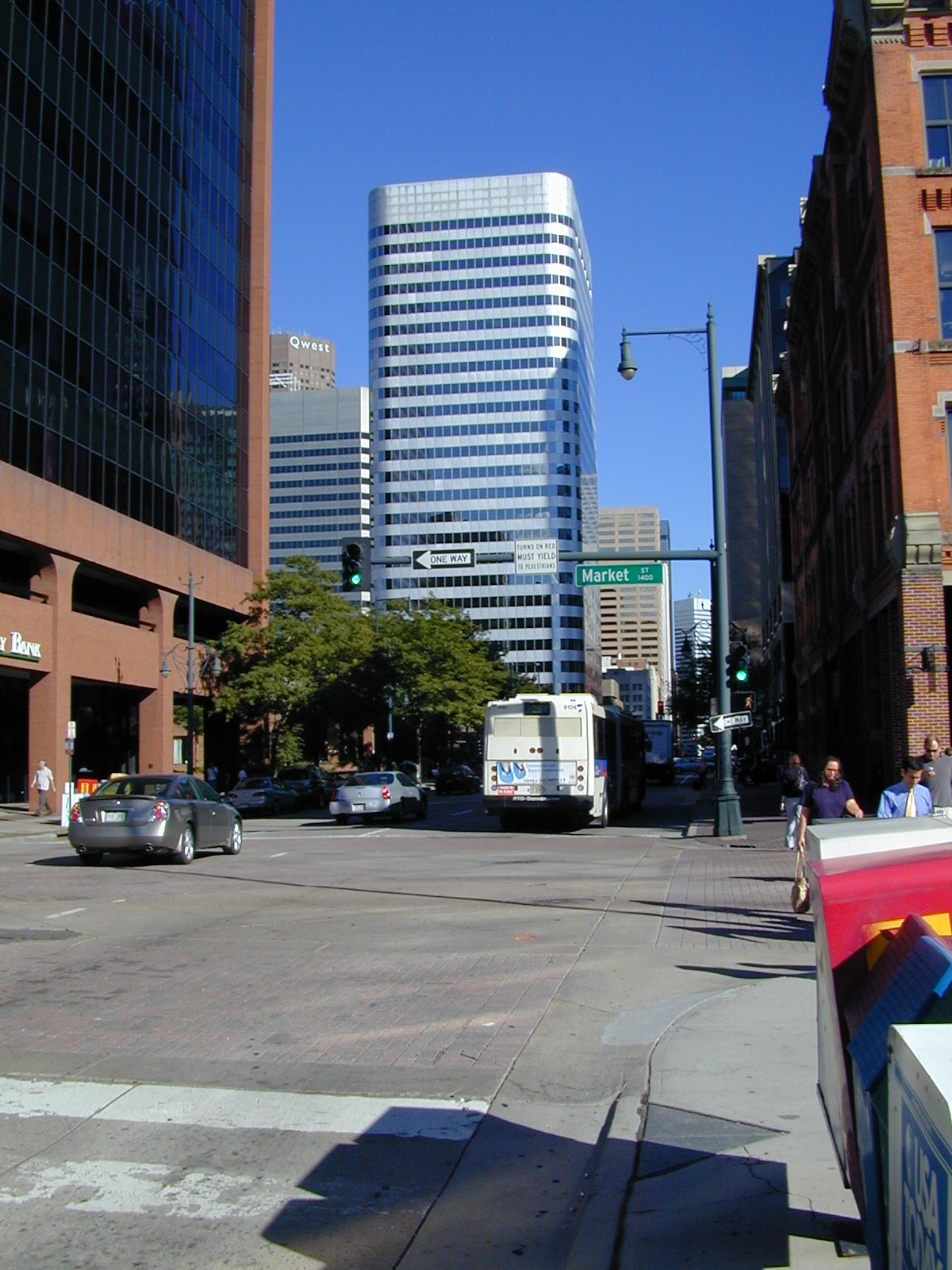
17th Street, dubbed the "Wall Street of the West," is home to many of Denver's banks, corporations, and financial agencies.

Tax is collected by the Colorado Department of Revenue.

The Colorado income tax rate is a flat 4.55 percent of federal taxable income regardless of income level. Colorado's state sales tax is 2.9 percent on retail sales. Full-year Colorado residents can claim an excess sales tax refund on their individual state income tax return. Many counties and cities charge their own rates in addition to the base state rate. There are also certain county and special district taxes that may apply. The most common special district taxes are:

- Regional Transportation District (RTD), which affects the counties of Denver, Boulder, Jefferson and portions of Adams, Arapahoe, Broomfield and Douglas
- Cultural Facilities District (CD)
- Football Stadium District (FD or FTBL), approved by the voters to pay for and help build the Denver Broncos’ stadium
- Local Improvement District (LID) within designated areas of southeast Jefferson and Boulder counties
- Regional Transportation District (RTA) taxes at varying rates in Basalt, Carbondale, Glenwood Springs, Gunnison County

Real estate and personal business property are taxable in Colorado. Real property is assessed by a professional assessor to determine its actual value. The state legislature sets the assessment rate of 29% for commercial property, 7.15% for residential. The actual value is multiplied by the assessment rate get the assessed value. Then counties set their mill rate which is multiplied by the assessed value to get the tax liability. A $430,000 residence in Denver with the Mill rate of 0.072116 yields the following example. " $430,000 x 0.0715 x 0.072116 = $2,217.21".

Colorado first instituted a state income tax in 1937, as a progressive tax, with income below $2,000 taxed at 1% and over $10,000 at 6%. This would remain so for 50 years, until the state adopted a flat tax rate of 5% for 1987 tax year. In 1992, the voters approved Taxpayer Bill of Rights at a referendum, requiring increases in overall tax revenue to be tied to inflation and population increases, otherwise tax increases would have to be approved by voters by referendum. For tax year 1999, the income tax was reduced further to 4.75% and for tax year 2000 to 4.63%, where it would remain for 20 years, until voters approved by referendum a further reduction to 4.55%. In 2018, voters rejected in a referendum a return to progressive tax.

== Denver's economy ==
Denver's economy (Denver is the Rocky Mountain region's most populous city) started because of its geographic position on the Platte River and Cherry Creek. The Denver metropolitan area is the largest in the area (the nearest metro area of comparable size is the Kansas City Metropolitan Area about 600 miles east). Denver is the location of federal, high-tech, educational, commercial, financial, cultural, tourist, storage, and distribution services to the Rocky Mountain States. The city is also home to several large corporations in the central United States.

=== Geography and trade ===
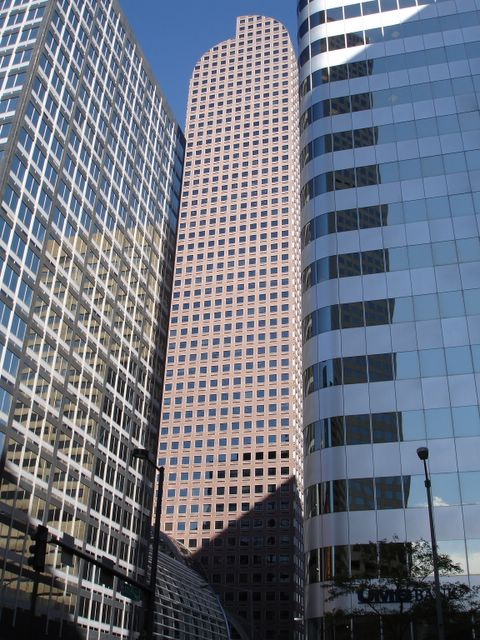
The Wells Fargo Center (also known as "The Cash Register Building") in downtown Denver

Many federal agencies are based or have offices in the Denver area. In addition to federal agencies, there are many companies based on federal defense and space projects such as Lockheed-Martin. Denver is the capital of Colorado and hosts many state government jobs.

Denver's position as the largest city in a mineral-rich and fossil fuel-rich area leads mining and energy companies to maintain offices in the metro area. In the early days of the city, gold and silver booms and busts played a large role in the economic success of the city. In the 1970s and early 1980s, the energy crisis in America created an energy boom in Denver captured in the soap opera Dynasty. Downtown Denver was built up considerably during this time; many new downtown skyscrapers were built. Eventually the oil prices dropped from $34 a barrel in 1981 to $9 a barrel in 1986, and the Denver economy dropped with it, leaving almost 15,000 oil industry workers in the area unemployed (including former mayor John Hickenlooper, a former geologist), and the highest office vacancy rate in the nation (30%). Energy and mining are still important in Denver's economy today, with companies such as Newmont Mining, Patina Oil and Gas, and Antero Resources.

Denver's west-central geographic location in the Mountain Time Zone (UTC −7) also benefits the telecommunications industry by allowing communication with both North American coasts, South America, Europe, and Asia in the same business day . Denver's location on the 105th meridian west at over 1 mile in elevation also enables it to be the largest city in the U.S. to offer a 'one-bounce' real-time satellite uplink to six continents in the same business day . Lumen Technologies, Dish Network, and Comcast are just a few of the telecommunications companies with operations in the Denver area .

== Agriculture ==
A Red Angus on prairie grassland near Eads

Colorado's agriculture supports a $47 billion economy with more than 426,000 employees and $1.7 billion in exports. Farming and ranching takes 32 million acres of Colorado land. Colorado's agriculture consumes 88% of the state's water or 4.7 million acre feet. The northeast of the state has the most agricultural business.

Drought has been one of the main risks to the agricultural industry. From 2012 to 2013, drought fueled a political push for the federal government to subsidize crop insurance. This led to $196 million in subsidy to Colorado farmers in 2014. Colorado farmers paid over $71.3 million for crop insurance in 2020.

Colorado's agricultural industry has been fueled by agricultural technology especially through research with Colorado State University which began as an agricultural school in 1870.

== Aerospace ==
Colorado is one of the top locations for the aerospace industry in the world. Colorado has offices for most of the major Aerospace companies such as BAE Systems (formerly Ball Aerospace & Technologies), Lockheed-Martin, Raytheon Technologies, Boeing, L3Harris Technologies, ULA, Northrop Grumman, Sierra Space, and Maxar Technologies. This industry employs over 240,000 Coloradans in 280 companies. The industry continued to experience strong growth of 7.2% in 2019 to contribute over $15 billion to the state economy.

The aerospace industry thrives in Colorado owing to its geographical centrality, being away from possible foreign threats, support from Fort Carson, and a highly educated population. Research is also conducted at government-funded labs such as NIST, LASP, NOAA, and UCAR. The University of Colorado Boulder also has one of the nation's top aerospace programs, receiving more NASA research funds than any other school.

== Venture capital ==
In 2006, Jared Polis and others began TechStars which grew to a global venture capital fund. However TechStars is only one of Colorado's 53 startup incubators. According to the Colorado Technology Association in 2026, "Colorado has built one of the most productive startup pipelines in the country". However, most of the startups that become successful do not remain in Colorado.

== See also ==
- Colorado Companies
- List of Colorado companies
- List of companies with Denver area operations
- List of power stations in Colorado
