= Economy of Idaho =

The gross state product (state GDP) for the state of Idaho was $128.1 billion in 2024, and the state's per capita income that year was $61,836. Idaho has the 46th highest GDP per capita in the United States of America.

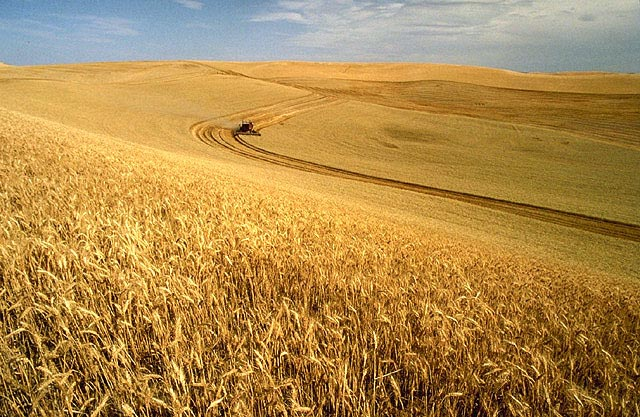
Wheat harvest on the Palouse

Idaho is an important agricultural state, generating billions of dollars per year in commodities such as dairy products, cattle, and potatoes. It is the top potato-producing state in the United States, and almost one-third of the nation's potatoes are grown in the Snake River Plain, a belt of low-lying land that extends across southern Idaho. Three major varieties of wheat—dark northern spring, hard red, and soft white—are grown in the state.

Important industries in Idaho are food processing, lumber and wood products, machinery, chemical products, paper products, electronics manufacturing, silver and other mining, and tourism. The world's largest factory for barrel cheese, the raw product for processed cheese, is in Gooding, Idaho. The facility has an annual capacity of 120,000 metric tons and is owned by the Glanbia Group.

== History ==
As Idaho neared statehood, mining and other extractive industries played a significant role in its economy. Although the state's reliance on mining has diminished over time, Idaho remains renowned as "The Gem State" due to its production of seventy-two varieties of precious and semi-precious stones. Idaho is a leading national producer of potatoes, trout, Austrian winter peas, and lentils. The state's primary industries include manufacturing, agriculture, food processing, timber, and mining.

Tourism is another way that Idaho capitalizes on its natural resources. The same tracts of wilderness that attracted Ernest Hemingway to the region in the early 1960s continue to attract outdoor enthusiasts with camping, hunting, fishing, whitewater kayaking, rafting, and skiing.

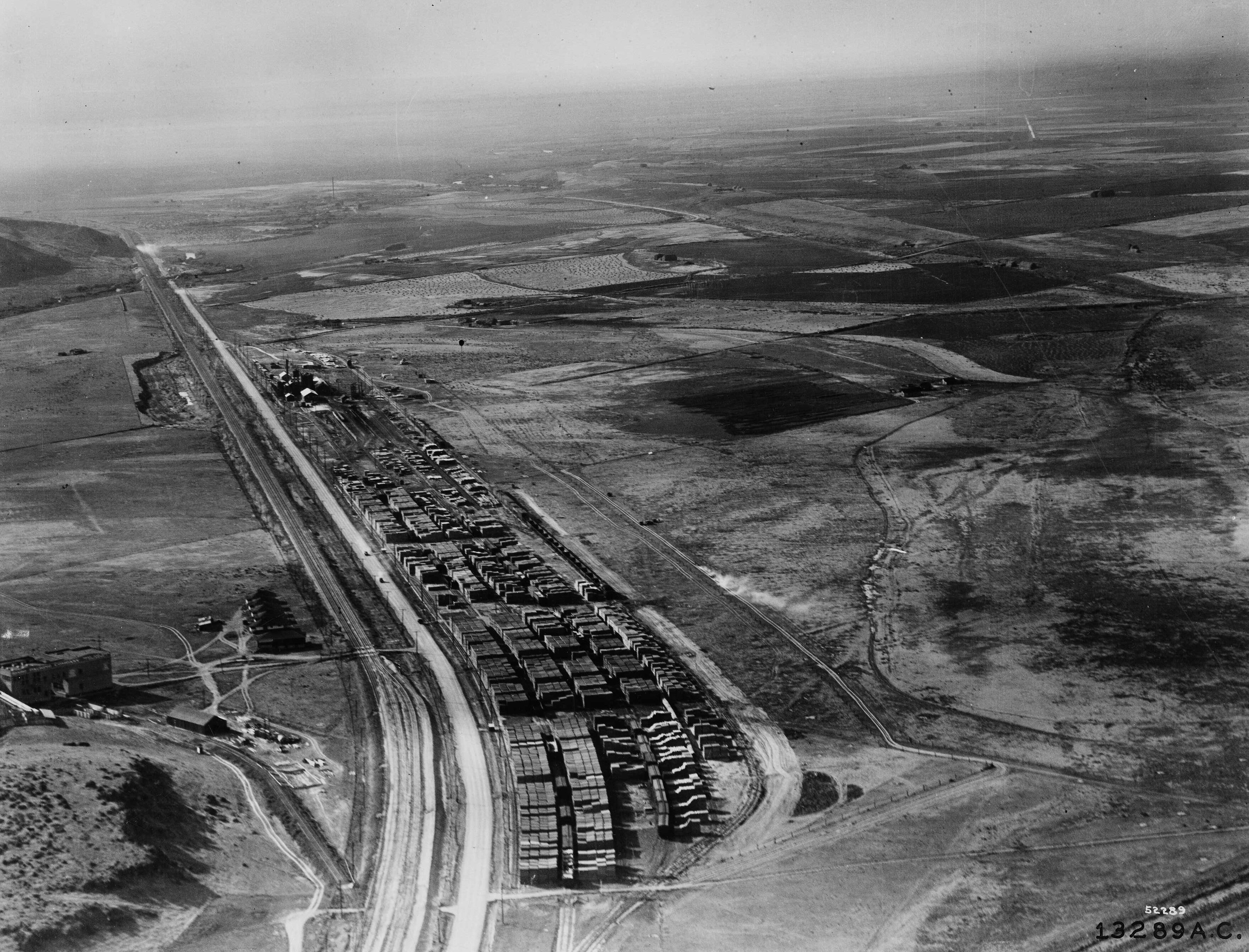
Sawmill in Pocatello, 1923

The Idaho National Laboratory (INL) is the largest Department of Energy facility in the country by area. The INL is an important part of the eastern Idaho economy.

Outdoor recreation is a major industry in Idaho, encompassing activities from snowmobiling and downhill and cross-country skiing during the winter months to the development of Lewiston into a retirement destination. Lewiston's reputation as a retirement community is attributed to its mild winters, dry year-round climate, one of the lowest median wind velocities in the region, and access to rivers that offer a number of options for recreation.

Other examples would be ATK Corporation, which operates three ammunition and ammunition components plants in Lewiston. Two produce sporting ammunition, while the third focuses on defense contracts. The Lewis-Clark valley has an additional independent ammunition components manufacturer and the Chipmunk rifle factory until it was purchased in 2007 by Keystone Sporting Arms and production was moved to Milton, Pennsylvania. Four of the world's six welded aluminum jet boat (for running river rapids) manufacturers are in the Lewiston-Clarkston, WA valley. Wine grapes were grown between Kendrick and Juliaetta in the Idaho Panhandle by the French Rothschilds until Prohibition.

Between 1991 and 2002, Idaho expanded its commercial base to include the science and technology sector which accounted for over 25% of its Gross state product in 2001.

Since the late 1970s, Boise emerged as a center for semiconductor manufacturing. Boise is the home of Micron Technology, the only U.S. manufacturer of dynamic random-access memory (DRAM) chips. Coldwater Creek, a women's clothing retailer was headquartered in Sandpoint.

== Agriculture ==
Agriculture in Idaho is an important part of the state's way of life and represents a substantial portion of the state's economy. 20% of Idaho's sales each year are generated by agriculture and food/beverage processing. In 2015, agricultural products were valued at $7,463,718,000, with slightly over half of that from the sale of livestock and dairy products. Cattle is the second largest agriculture sector of the state and Idaho is the third largest producer of milk and cheese in the United States. Although dairy plays a significant role in the economy, Idaho is most known for its potatoes. Idaho is the number one producer of potatoes in the nation and contributes to 32% of the country's production. Idaho has nearly 25,000 farms and ranches spread over 11.8 million acres of land that produces more than 185 different agricultural products. The state's production ranks in the top ten in the nation in nearly 30 of the commodities it produces.

== Taxation ==
The state personal income tax ranges from 1.6% to 7.8% in eight income brackets. Idahoans may apply for state tax credits for taxes paid to other states, as well as for donations to Idaho state educational entities and some nonprofit youth and rehabilitation facilities.

The state sales tax was introduced at 3% in 1965, easily approved by voters, where it remained until 1983. The sales tax is 6% with a very limited, selective local option up to 6.5%. Sales tax applies to the sale, rental or lease of tangible personal property and some services. Food is taxed, but prescription drugs are not. Hotel, motel, and campground accommodations are taxed at a higher rate (7% to 11%). Some jurisdictions impose local option sales tax.

== Gambling ==
Idaho has a state gambling lottery which contributed $333.5 million in payments to all Idaho public schools and Idaho higher education from 1990 to 2006.

== Statistics ==
Total employment (2016)

- 562,282

Total employer establishments

- 45,826

== See also ==
- Economy of Washington (state)
