= Economy of Arizona =

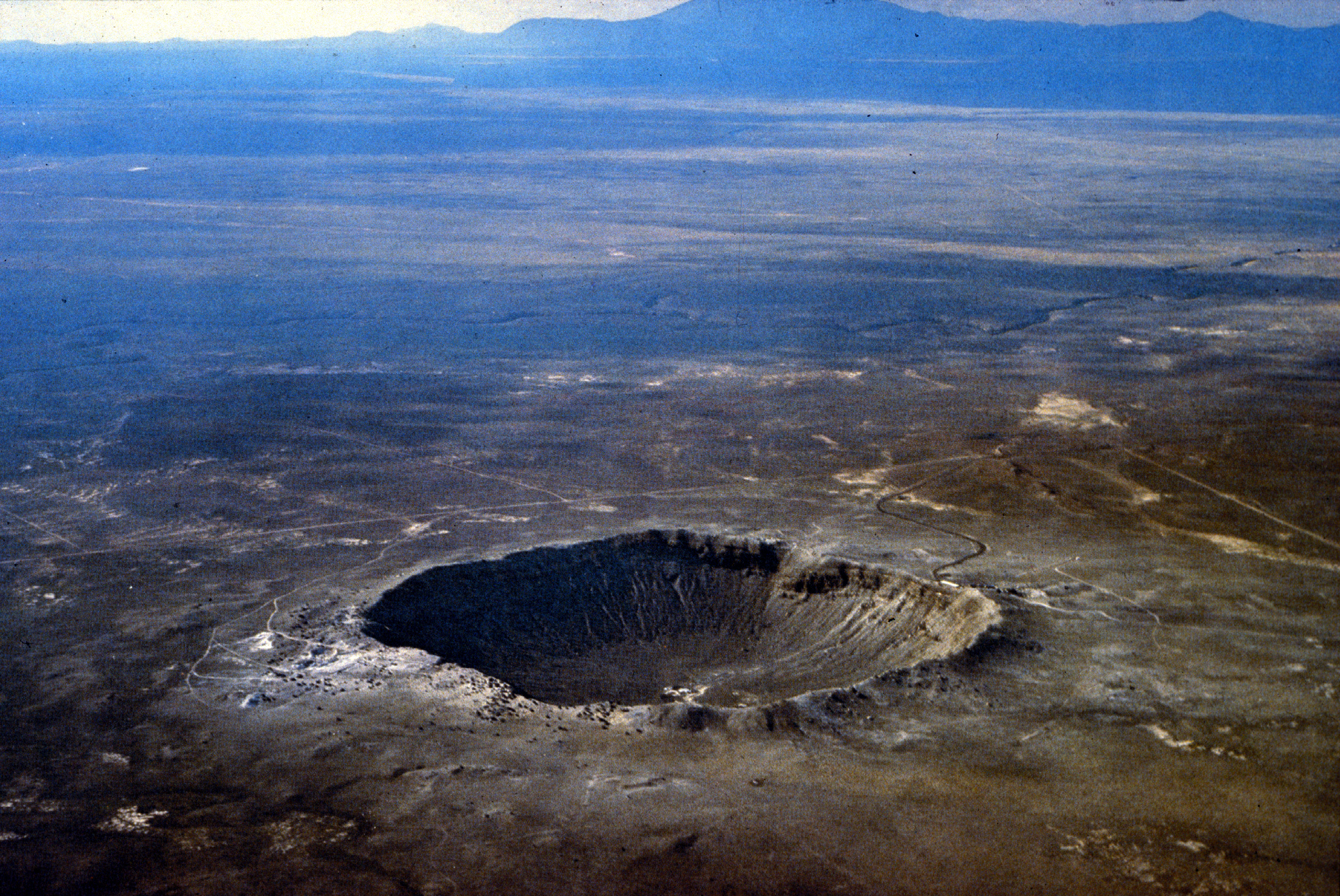
Arizona's Meteor Crater is a tourist attraction.

The economy of Arizona had a total gross state product in 2025 of $598.1 billion. The composition of the state's economy is moderately diverse, although health care, transportation and the government remain the largest sectors. Early in its history, Arizona's economy relied on the "five C's": copper, cotton, cattle, citrus, and climate. Copper is still extensively mined from many expansive open-pit and underground mines, accounting for two-thirds of the nation's output.

As of 2025, Arizona's largest trading partners include Mexico, Taiwan, Canada, and China.

Arizona's per capita personal income was $68,283 in 2025, ranking 36th in the U.S. The state's 2023 median household income was $74,568, ranking 19th in the country and just below the U.S. national mean.

== Sectors ==
Copper mining began in the state in the 19th century. Cotton cultivation declined after peaks in the 20th century. After the 1990s, "home building and development displaced most of the large scale orchards" that constituted the state's citrus industry. Arizona's cattle industry has grown since the early 20th century. Arizona's climate drives its tourism and agricultural industries in fall and winter.

Intel has operated in the state for more than forty years. TSMC's chip plants in the state are "the largest single foreign investment project in U.S. history."

== Employment ==
- Total employment (April 2025): 3,633,200
- Total employer establishments (2016): 139,134

In 2025, 99.5% of Arizona businesses were small businesses and employed 42.% of the state's work force.

The state government is Arizona's largest employer, while Banner Health is the state's largest private employer, with more than 40,000 employees in the state as of 2016.

As of May 2025, the state's unemployment rate was 4.1%. Seasonally adjusted nonfarm employment in Arizona was as follows:

Sector	April 2025	August 2020
Trade, transportation, and utilities	▲618,100	553,300
Education and health services	▲556,200	459,400
Government	▲435,100	430,400
Professional and business services	▲461,200	419,200
Leisure and hospitality	▲367,900	269,400
Financial activities	▲242,000	231,900
Manufacturing	▲192,800	170,900
Construction	▲225,300	169,900
Other services	▲106,800	95,600
Information	▲47,700	46,100
Mining and logging	▲15,700	13,300

== Largest employers ==
According to The Arizona Republic, the largest private employers in the state as of 2019 were:

Rank	Company	Employees	Industry
1	Banner Health	44,718	Healthcare
2	Walmart Stores, Inc.	34,071	Discount retailer
3	Kroger Co.	20,530	Grocery stores
4	Wells Fargo & Co.	16,161	Financial services
5	Albertsons Inc.	14,500	Grocery stores, retail drugstores
6	McDonald's Corp.	13,000	Food service
7	CVS Health	12,100	Healthcare
8	Raytheon Co.	12,000	Defense
9	HonorHealth	11,919	Healthcare
10	Dignity Health	10,562	Healthcare
11	Intel Corp.	10,400	Semiconductor manufacturing
12	Home Depot Inc.	10,200	Retail home improvement
13 (tie)	JP Morgan Chase & Co.	10,000	Financial services
13 (tie)	American Airlines	10,000	Airline
15	Tenet Healthcare	9,483	Healthcare
16	Bank of America Corp.	9,200	Financial services
17	Freeport-McMoRan Copper & Gold Inc.	8,759	Mining
18	Bashas' Supermarkets	8,519	Grocery stores
19	Amazon.com	8,500	Online shopping
20	Target Corp.	8,400	Discount retailer
21	Honeywell International Inc.	7,792	Aerospace manufacturing
22	Circle K Corp.	7,478	Convenience stores
23	Mayo Foundation	7,436	Healthcare
24	State Farm	7,200	Insurance
25	UnitedHealthcare	7,194	Healthcare

== Taxation ==
Arizona collects personal income taxes in five brackets: 2.59%, 2.88%, 3.36%, 4.24% and 4.54%. The state transaction privilege tax is 5.6%; however, county and municipal sales taxes generally add an additional 2%.

The state rate on transient lodging (hotel/motel) is 7.27%. The state of Arizona does not levy a state tax on food for home consumption or on drugs prescribed by a licensed physician or dentist. However, some cities in Arizona do levy a tax on food for home consumption.

All fifteen Arizona counties levy a tax. Incorporated municipalities also levy transaction privilege taxes which, with the exception of their hotel/motel tax, are generally in the range of 1-to-3%. These added assessments could push the combined sales tax rate to as high as 10.7%.

Single	Tax rate	Joint	Tax rate
0 – $10,000	2.59%	0 – $20,000	2.59%
$10,000 – $25,000	2.88%	$20,001 – $50,000	2.88%
$25,000 – $50,000	3.36%	$50,001 – $100,000	3.36%
$50,000 – $150,001	4.24%	$100,000 – $300,001	4.24%
$150,001 +	4.54%	$300,001 +	4.54%

== See also ==
- List of power stations in Arizona
- Copper mining in Arizona
