= Economy of Delaware =

This article is intended to give an overview of the economy of Delaware.

== Affluence ==
Average sale price for new & existing homes (in US$)
DE County	March 2010	March 2011
New Castle	229,000	216,000
Sussex	323,000	296,000
Kent	186,000	178,000

According to a 2013 study by Phoenix Marketing International, Delaware had the ninth-largest number of millionaires per capita in the United States, with a ratio of 6.20 percent.

== Agriculture ==
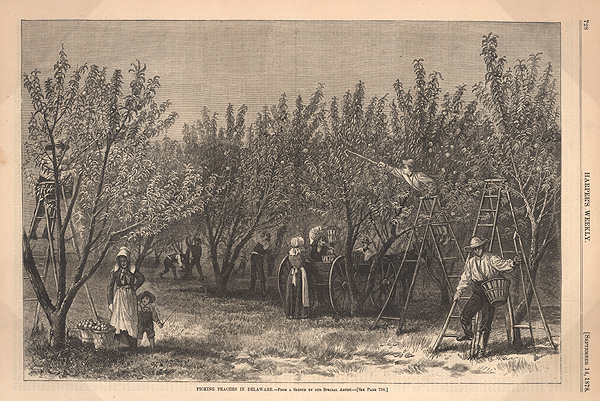
"Picking Peaches in Delaware" from an 1878 issue of Harper's Weekly

Delaware's agricultural output consists of poultry, soybeans, dairy products, melons, hay, alfalfa, barley, wheat, and corn.

== Energy ==
=== Solar power ===
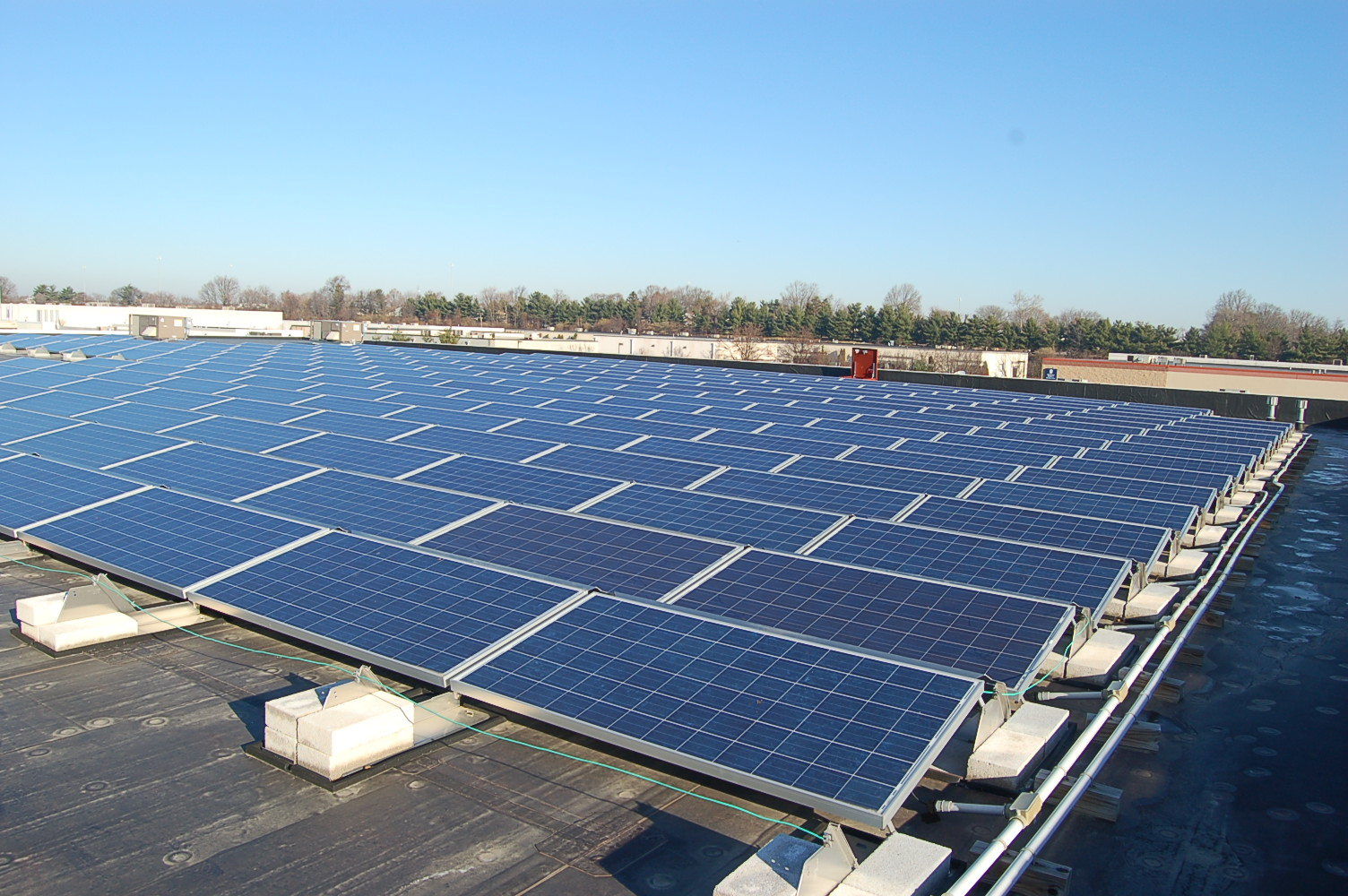
Solar installation, New Castle

Solar power in Delaware is small industry. Delaware had 150 MW of total installed capacity in 2020. The largest solar farms in the state included the 10 MW Dover Sun Park and the 12 MW Milford Solar Farm.

The expansion of Bruce A. Henry Solar Farm near Georgetown in Sussex County from 23 to 40 acres was completed in 2020.

In a 2012 study, a typical 5 kW system will pay for itself in five years, and go on to provide a savings of $37,837 over the balance of its 25-year life. It is estimated that 19% of all electricity use in Delaware can be provided by rooftop solar panels. The state's renewable portfolio standard requires 0.4% from solar in 2012, 0.6% in 2013, 3.5% from solar by 2025, and 25% from renewable sources.

Net metering is available for residential customers up to 25 kW and others from 100 kW to 2 MW depending on type of customer and the utility. Excess generation is credited at retail rate to next month's bill and optionally paid once a year at energy supply rate (normally referred to as "avoided cost").

=== Wind power ===
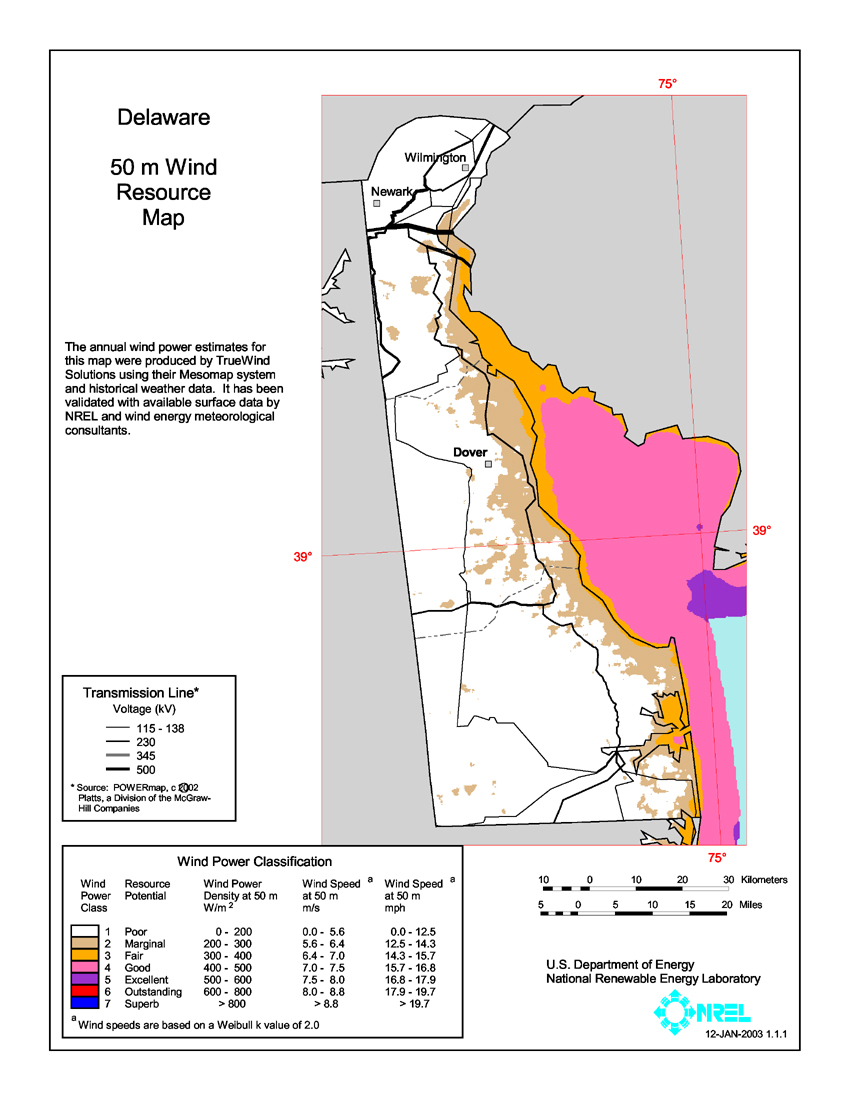
Wind potential in Delaware

The potential of on-shore wind power in Delaware is minimal, having a potential of generating at most 22 GWh/year. Delaware's principal wind potential is from offshore wind. A 2012 assessment estimates that 15,038 MW of offshore wind turbines could generate 60,654 GWh/year. Delaware generated 11,522 GWh from all generating sources in 2011.

2 MW of large scale wind capacity has been constructed in Delaware. A single 256-foot tall, 210-ton turbine at the University of Delaware in Lewes was built in 2010 for generating and educational purposes. It produced 5 GWh of electricity in 2015. There are no projects under construction, but there is a planned offshore wind power project that would produce 120 MW

The state of Delaware ran a request for proposals (RFP) during 2006-2007 that is notable as the first known RFP, world-wide, in which offshore wind power competed equally against coal and natural gas power alternatives.

== Industries ==
As of October 2015, the state's unemployment rate was 5.1%.

The state's largest employers are:

- government (State of Delaware, New Castle County)
- education (University of Delaware, Delaware Technical & Community College)
- banking (Bank of America, M&T Bank, JPMorgan Chase, Citigroup, Deutsche Bank)
- chemical, pharmaceutical, technology (DuPont de Nemours Inc., AstraZeneca, Syngenta, Agilent Technologies)
- healthcare (ChristianaCare, Bayhealth Medical Center, Nemours Children's Hospital, Delaware)
- farming, specifically chicken farming in Sussex County (Perdue Farms, Mountaire Farms, Allen Family Foods)
- retail (Walmart, Walgreens, Acme Markets)

Dover Air Force Base, located next to the state capital of Dover, is one of the largest Air Force bases in the country and is a major employer in Delaware. In addition to its other responsibilities in the United States Air Force Air Mobility Command, this air base serves as the entry point and mortuary for American military personnel and some U.S. government civilians who die overseas.

=== Industrial decline ===
Since the mid-2000s, Delaware has seen the departure of the state's automotive manufacturing industry (General Motors Wilmington Assembly and Chrysler Newark Assembly), the corporate buyout of a major bank holding company (MBNA), the departure of the state's steel industry (Evraz Claymont Steel), the bankruptcy of a fiber mill (National Vulcanized Fibre), and the diminishing presence of AstraZeneca in Wilmington.

In late 2015, DuPont announced that 1,700 employees, nearly a third of its footprint in Delaware, would be laid off in early 2016. The merger of E.I. du Pont de Nemours & Co. and Dow Chemical Company into DowDuPont took place on September 1, 2017.

== Incorporation in Delaware ==
More than 50% of all U.S. publicly traded companies and 63% of the Fortune 500 are incorporated in Delaware. The state's attractiveness as a corporate haven is largely because of its business-friendly corporation law. Franchise taxes on Delaware corporations supply about one-fifth of its state revenue. Although "USA (Delaware)" ranked as the world's most opaque jurisdiction on the Tax Justice Network's 2009 Financial Secrecy Index, the same group's 2011 Index ranks the USA fifth and does not specify Delaware. In April 2016, the Sunlight Foundation reported that Delaware had more than a million businesses incorporated in the state, which was more than the state's population at that time.

== Food and drink ==
Title 4, chapter 7 of the Delaware Code stipulates that alcoholic liquor only be sold in specifically licensed establishments, and only between 9:00 am and 1:00 am. Until 2003, Delaware was among the several states enforcing blue laws and banned the sale of liquor on Sunday.
