= Economy of New York (state) =

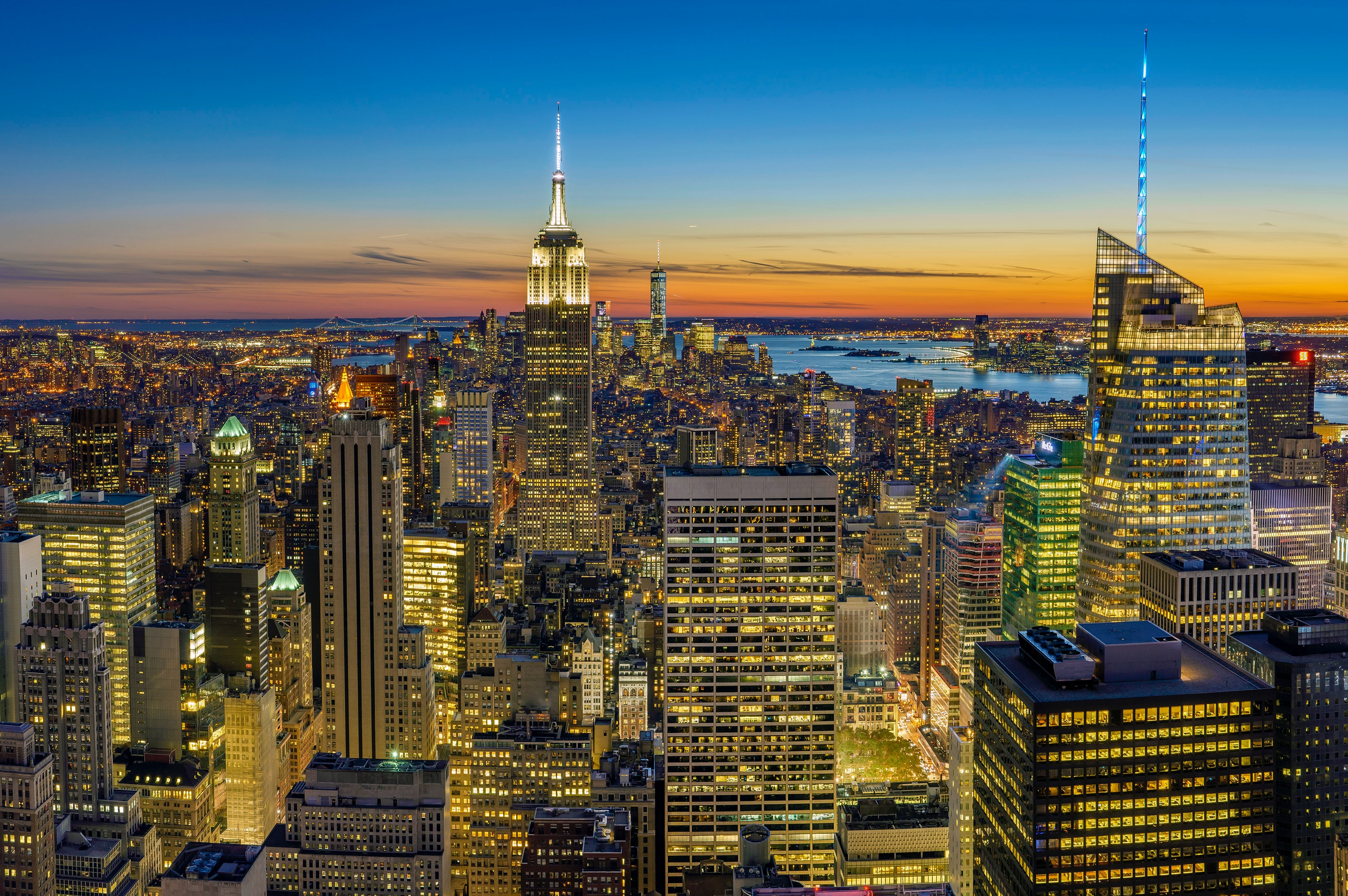
- New York City, the economic capital of New York (state) and the world

Statistics
- GDP: $2.465 trillion (2025)
- GDP per capita: $123,273 (2025)
- Population below national poverty line: 13.6%
- Gini coefficient: 0.5157 ± 0.0029 (2023)
- Labour force: 9,645,984 (2023)
- Unemployment: 4.3% (Aug. 2026)

Public finance
- Revenue: $63.5 billion
- Spending: $54.6 billion

The economy of the State of New York is reflected in its gross state product in 2025 of $2.465 trillion, ranking third in size behind the larger states of California and Texas. If New York State were an independent nation, it would rank as the 8th largest economy in the world by nominal GDP. However, in 2024, the multi-state, New York City-centered metropolitan statistical area produced a gross metropolitan product (GMP) over $US2.6 trillion, ranking first nationally by a wide margin and also ranked as the largest GDP in the world. By 2025, tourism had become New York's second-largest industry, after finance.

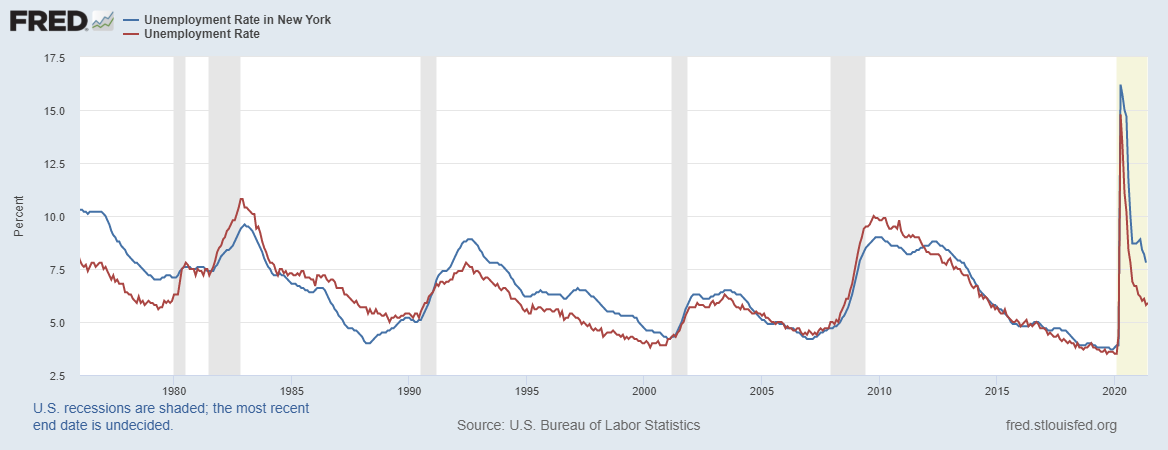
New York State unemployment rate, 1976–2021 US unemployment rate

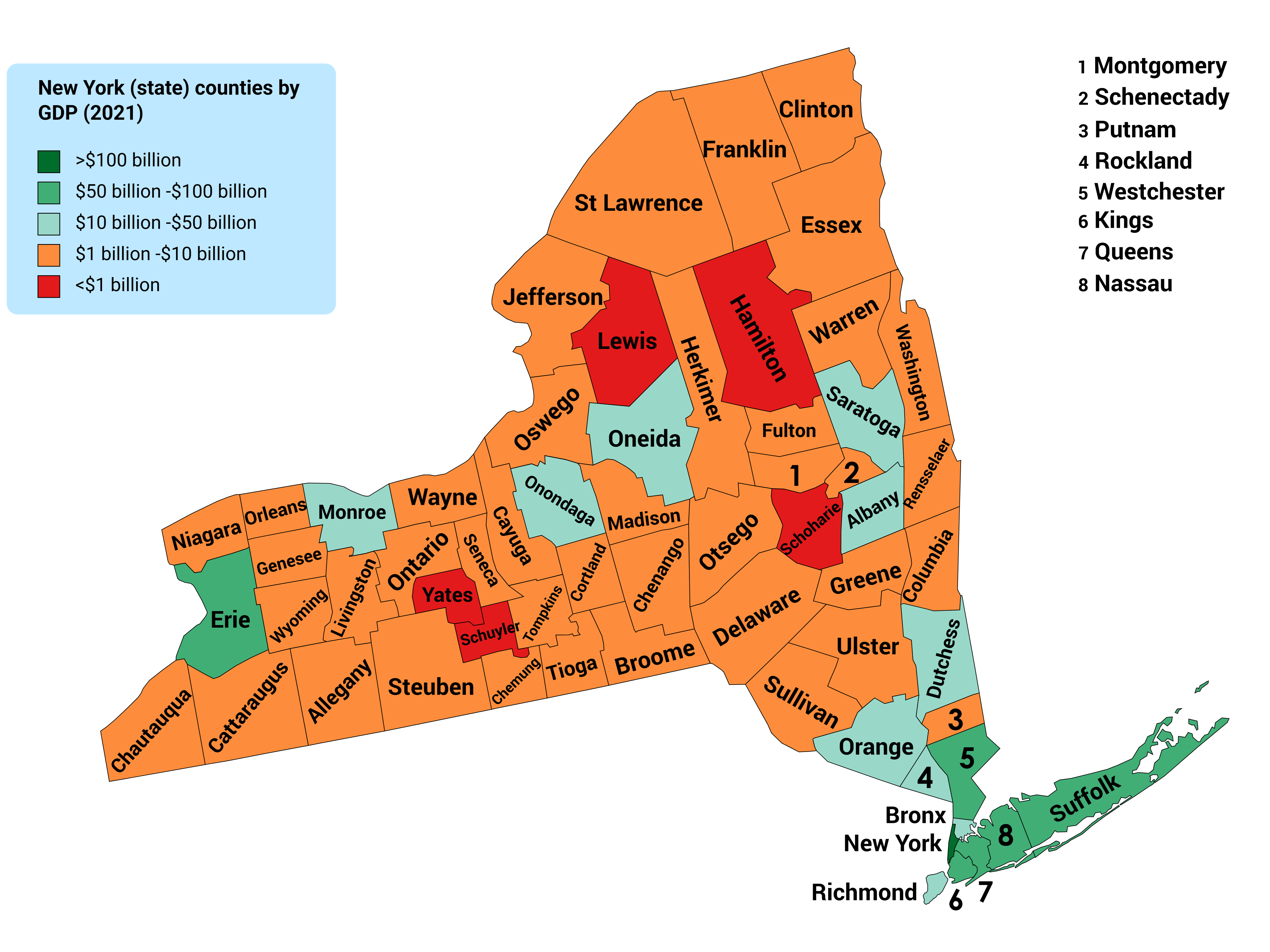
New York (state) counties by GDP (2021)

Finance, technology, (including AI and medical technology) health care and life sciences research, high technology and biotechnology, real estate, and insurance all form the backbone of New York State's economy. The state also has a large manufacturing sector, which includes printing and publishing and the production of computers, consumer electronics, apparel, railroad rolling stock, and bus line vehicles. Some industries are concentrated in upstate locations also, such as ceramics and glass (the southern tier of counties), microchips and nanotechnology (Albany) and the Greater Capital District, and photographic equipment (Rochester). New York's agricultural outputs comprise dairy products, cattle and other livestock, vegetables, nursery stock, and apples. In April 2021, GlobalFoundries, a company specializing in the semiconductor industry, moved its headquarters from Silicon Valley, California to its most advanced semiconductor-chip manufacturing facility in Saratoga County near a section of the Adirondack Northway, in Malta, New York.

== New York City ==
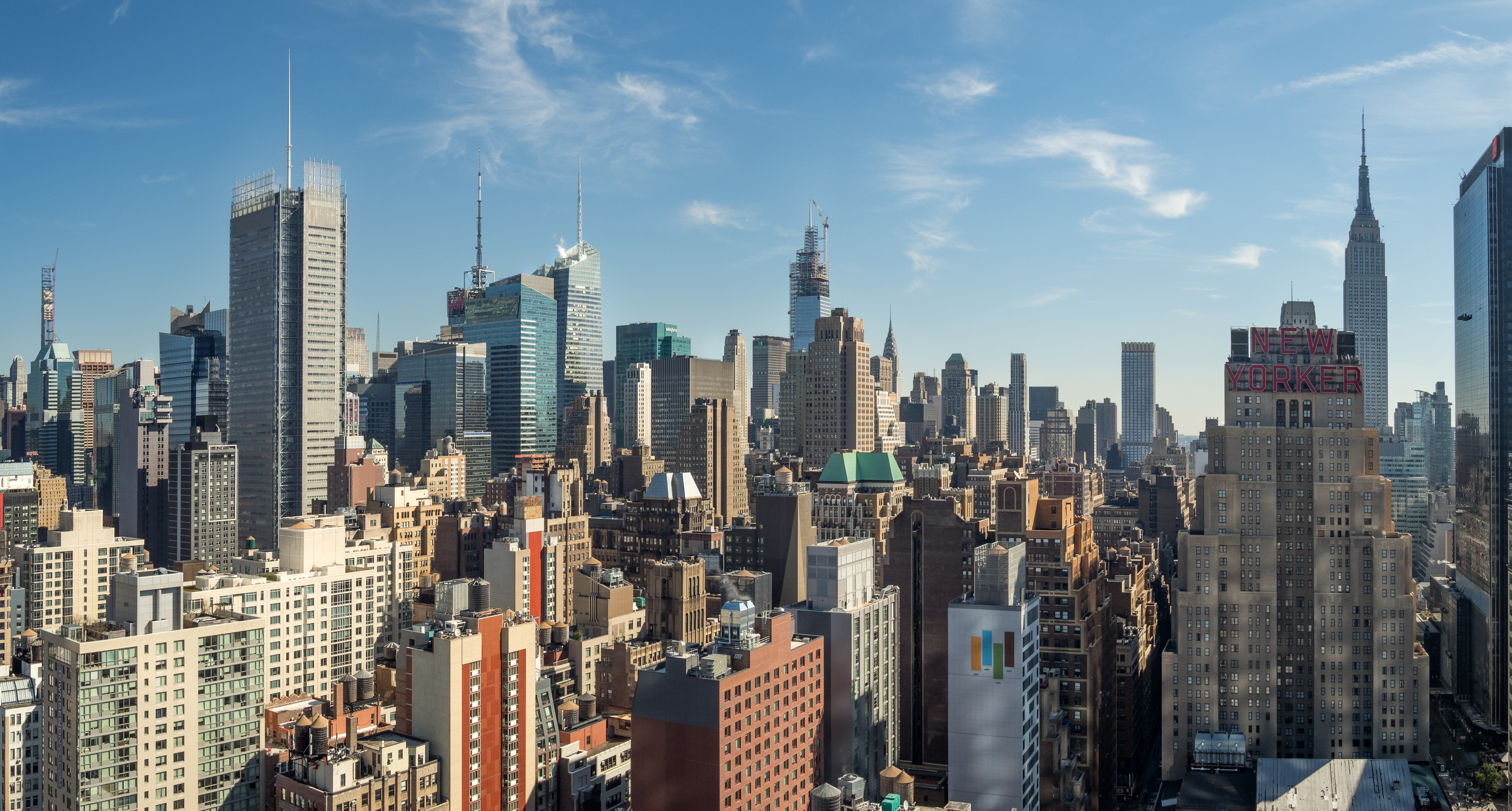
Looking from the West Side toward the East Side of Midtown Manhattan in New York City, the largest central business district in the world. Manhattan is the epicenter of the world's principal metropolitan economy.

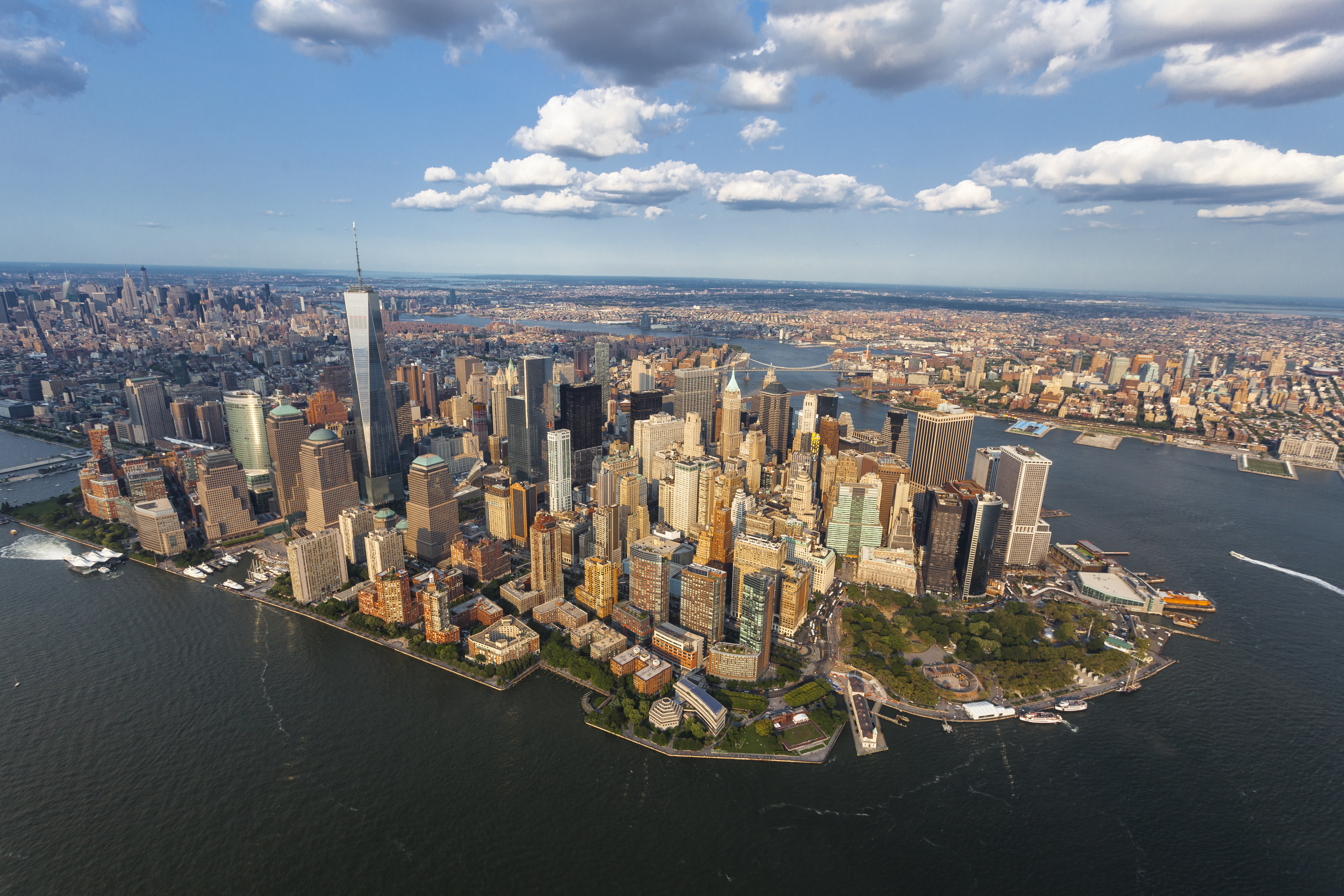
Lower Manhattan, the home of Wall Street, anchors New York as the world's principal fintech and financial center.

New York City, characterized as the world's principal fintech and financial center, and the surrounding New York metropolitan area dominate the economy of the state. Manhattan is the leading center of banking, finance, and communication in the United States and is the location of the New York Stock Exchange (NYSE) on Wall Street. Many of the world's largest corporations locate their home offices in Manhattan or in nearby Westchester, Nassau, and Suffolk counties. Manhattan contained over 500 million square feet (46.5 million m^{2}) of office space in 2015, making it the largest office market in the United States, while Midtown Manhattan, with nearly 400 million square feet (37.2 million m^{2}) in 2015, is the largest central business district in the world. New York is a top-tier global high technology hub.

== Long Island ==
Long Island has played a prominent role in scientific research and in engineering. It is the home of the Brookhaven National Laboratory. Seven Nobel Prizes have been awarded for work conducted at Brookhaven lab.

== Agriculture ==
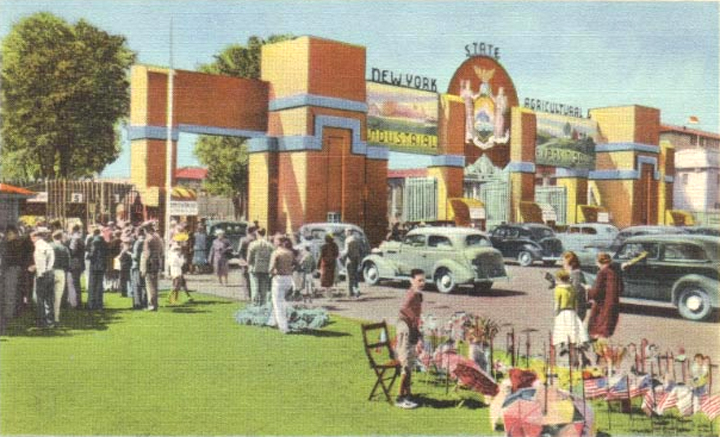
Postcard showing the Great New York State Fair main entrance in the 1940s

The Erie Canal, completed in 1825, opened eastern U.S. markets to Midwest farm products. The canal also contributed to the growth of New York City, helped create large cities, and encouraged immigration to the state. Except in the mountain regions, the areas between cities are agriculturally rich. The Finger Lakes region has orchards producing apples, which are one of New York's leading crops. The state is known for wines produced at vineyards in the Finger Lakes region and Long Island. The state also produces other crops, especially grapes, strawberries, cherries, pears, onions, and potatoes. New York is a major supplier of maple syrup and is the third leading producer of dairy goods in the United States.

According to the Department of Agriculture and Markets, New York's agricultural production returned more than $3.6 billion to the farm economy in 2005. 36,000 farms occupy 7.6 million acres or about 25 percent of the state's land area, to produce a variety of food products. Here are some of the items in which New York ranks high nationally:

New York is an agricultural leader and is one of the top five states for agricultural products, including dairy, cattle, apples, cabbages, potatoes, beets, viticulture, onions, maple syrup and many others. The state is the second largest producer of cabbage in the U.S. The state has about a quarter of its land in farms and produced $3.4 billion in agricultural products in 2001. The south shore of Lake Ontario provides the right mix of soils and microclimate for apple, cherry, plum, pear, and peach orchards. Apples are also grown in the Hudson Valley and near Lake Champlain. The south shore of Lake Erie and the southern Finger Lakes hillsides have vineyards. New York is the nation's third-largest grape-producing state, after California and Washington.

== Energy ==
In 2017, New York State consumed 156,370-gigawatthours (GWh) of electrical energy. Downstate regions (Hudson Valley, New York City, and Long Island) consumed 66% of that amount. Upstate regions produced 50% of that amount. The peak load in 2017 was 29,699 MW. The resource capability in 2017 was 42,839 MW. The NYISO's market monitor described the average all-in wholesale electric price as a range (a single value was not provided) from $25 per MWh to $53 per MWh for 2017.

=== Solar power ===
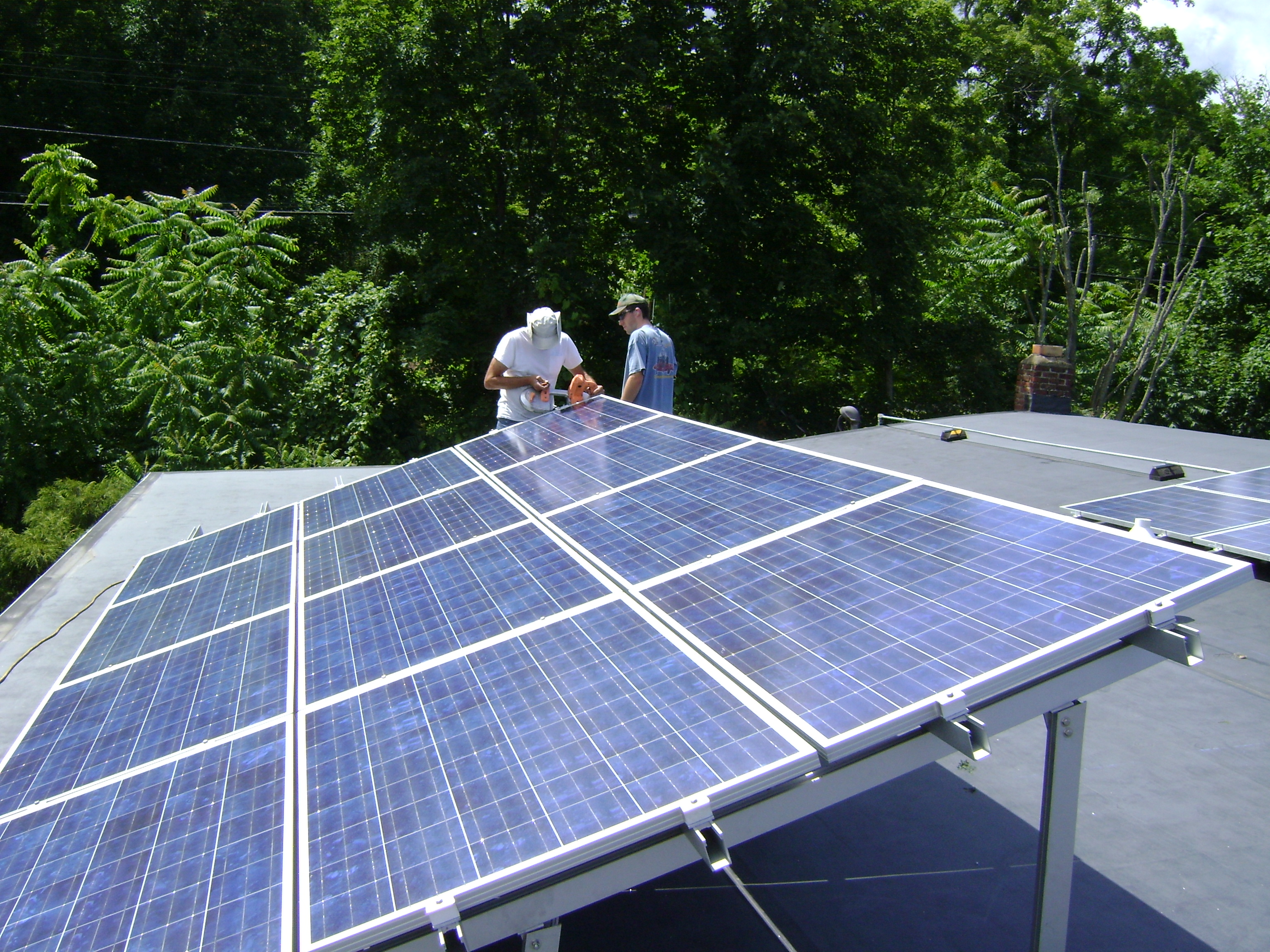
Installing rooftop solar panels in Poughkeepsie

New York had a renewable portfolio standard of 30% from renewable sources by 2015. In 2015, 24% was renewable, 6% short of the goal. Wind is the predominant generating technology. In 2018, the New York State Energy Research and Development Authority awarded long-term contracts to 22 utility-scale solar farms, totaling a combined capacity of 646 MW.

In 2012, LIPA adopted a power purchase agreement (limited to 50 MW), which paid $0.22/kWh for solar generation for installations ranging from 50 kW to 20 MW. A $500 to $5000 application fee favored larger power plants and represented roughly the first 10 days of generation for a 50 kW to 500 kW system, but less than 2 hours of generation for a 20 MW installation. The term of the agreement was 20 years, and systems had to be interconnected to the grid at the 13.2 kV level. Unlike the feed-in tariff programs in many other places, customers paid for their own electricity as if they were not generating any, making this actually a power purchase agreement, and not a feed-in tariff. LIPA owned the SRECs (which could be worth more than they were paying for the electricity). A bill to establish SRECs in New York failed to pass in 2012 . 50 MW of solar power would meet the average needs of about 7,000 households, or less than 1% of the electricity supplied by LIPA. 5 MW was reserved for systems less than 150 kW, and 10 MW for systems from 150 to 500 kW. The remaining 35 MW was available to systems of all sizes. If fully subscribed in the first year, the average household would pay an estimated $0.44/month to pay for the program, which would generate an estimated 79.4 million kWh/year. Estimated costs were based on an average avoided cost rate of $0.075/kWh, although peak generation costs could exceed $0.22/kWh, eliminating any cost. LIPA's total generation capacity, in 2011, was 6,800 MW.

In 2023, the New York State Energy Research and Development Authority approved 14 new large-scale solar projects, totaling more than 1 gigawatt of capacity.

As of December 2025, solar power supplies electricity to approximately 1.27 million homes in New York, accounting for 6.56% of the state's total electricity generation.

New York has one of the largest community solar program, with more than 1,700 MW installed, providing savings to more than 400,000 customers.

New York remained the leading community solar market nationally in 2025, adding 624 MWdc of new capacity despite a 20% year-over-year decline, as cumulative U.S. community solar installations surpassed 10 GWdc for the first time.

New York's largest solar project, Morris Ridge Solar, came online in December 2024 with 229 MWdc/177 MWac.

=== Wind power ===
New York has 2,192 MW of installed wind power capacity as of 2022. Most of New York's wind power is located upstate, as onshore wind farms. New York has set a goal of developing 9,000 MW of offshore installed wind power capacity by 2035 that will power an estimated 6 million homes. As of October 2022, the state has five offshore wind farms in development with approximately 4,300 MW installed capacity.

== Health care ==
The health care and social assistance sector accounted for the most non-farm employment in the state at 18.2%.

== Largest Fortune 500 companies in New York (2022) ==
NY State rank	US Rank	World Rank *	Company	City	Employees	Revenue (in millions, USD)	Industry	rank in its US industry
1	23	53	JPMorgan Chase	New York	293,723	$154,792	Commercial Banks	1st
2	26	64	Verizon Communications	New York	117,100	$136,835	Telecommunications	1st
3	36	99	Citigroup	New York	238,104	$101,078	Commercial Banks	3rd
4	38	102	Pfizer	New York	83,000	$100,330	Pharmaceuticals	1st
5	46	135	PepsiCo	Purchase	315,000	$86,392	Food Consumer Products	1st
6	54	183	MetLife	New York	45,000	$69,898	Insurance: Life, Health (Stock)	1st
7	55	185	Goldman Sachs Group	New York	48,500	$68,711	Commercial Banks	5th
8	59	198	StoneX Group	New York	3,615	$66,036	Diversified Financials	3rd
9	61	200	Morgan Stanley	New York	82,427	$65,936	Commercial Banks	6th
10	65	224	International Business Machines	Armonk	303,100	$60,530	Information Technology Services	1st
11	71	238	New York Life Insurance	New York	15,050	$58,445	Insurance: Life, Health (Mutual)	1st
12	76	248	American International Group	New York	26,200	$56,437	Insurance: Property and Casualty (Stock)	2nd
13	77	253	American Express	New York	77,300	$55,625	Diversified Financials	4th
14	95	312	Bristol-Myers Squibb	New York	34,300	$46,159	Pharmaceuticals	5th
15	103	366	TIAA	New York	16,070	$40,911	Insurance: Life, Health (Mutual)	2nd
16	112	409	Travelers	New York	32,175	$36,884	Insurance: Property and Casualty (Stock)	6th
17	118	449	Warner Bros. Discovery	New York	37,500	$33,817	Entertainment	1st
18	134	492	Paramount Global	New York	27,400	$31,331	Entertainment	4th
19	158	*	Macy's	New York	94,570	$25,305	General Merchandisers	4th
20	177	*	Mastercard	Purchase	29,900	$22,237	Financial Data Services	3rd
21	193	*	Marsh & McLennan	New York	85,000	$20,720	Diversified Financials	5th
22	201	*	Bank of New York Mellon	New York	51,700	$19,991	Commercial Banks	11th
23	225	*	Kyndryl Holdings	New York	90,000	$18,317	Information Technology Services	4th
24	228	*	Colgate-Palmolive	New York	33,800	$17,967	Household and Personal Products	3rd
25	229	*	BlackRock	New York	19,800	$17,873	Securities	2nd
26	230	*	Estée Lauder	New York	53,865	$17,737	Household and Personal Products	4th
27	264	*	Consolidated Edison	New York	14,319	$15,670	Utilities: Gas and Electric	10th
28	281	*	Guardian Life Ins. Co. of America	New York	8,025	$14,653	Insurance: Life, Health (Mutual)	5th
29	290	*	Omnicom Group	New York	74,200	$14,289	Advertising, Marketing	1st
30	292	*	Corning	Corning	57,500	$14,189	Electronics, Electrical Equip.	3rd
31	297	*	Loews	New York	12,050	$14,044	Insurance: Property and Casualty (Stock)	9th
32	298	*	Equitable Holdings	New York	10,250	$14,017	Insurance: Life, Health (Stock)	8th
33	300	*	Fox	New York	10,600	$13,974	Entertainment	6th
34	325	*	Henry Schein	Melville	22,000	$12,647	Wholesalers: Health Care	4th
35	332	*	International Flavors & Fragrances	New York	24,600	$12,440	Chemicals	10th
36	339	*	Regeneron Pharmaceuticals	Tarrytown	11,851	$12,173	Pharmaceuticals	11th
37	356	*	Apollo Global Management	New York	4,258	$11,627	Securities	4th
38	358	*	Hess	New York	1,623	$11,570	Mining, Crude-Oil Production	12th
39	366	*	S&P Global	New York	39,950	$11,181	Financial Data Services	7th
40	371	*	Interpublic Group	New York	58,400	$10,928	Advertising, Marketing	2nd
41	381	*	News Corp.	New York	25,500	$10,385	Publishing, Printing	1st
42	397	*	Altice USA	Long Island City	11,000	$9,648	Telecommunications	7th
43	417	*	JetBlue Airways	Long Island City	18,785	$9,158	Airlines	6th
44	422	*	PVH	New York	25,000	$9,024	Apparel	3rd
45	430	*	Constellation Brands	Victor	10,000	$8,821	Beverages	4th
46	432	*	Foot Locker	New York	31,040	$8,759	Specialty Retailers: Apparel	4th
47	439	*	M&T Bank	Buffalo	22,509	$8,604	Commercial Banks	12th
48	444	*	Blackstone	New York	4,695	$8,518	Diversified Financials	11th
49	475	*	ABM Industries	New York	127,000	$7,807	Diversified Outsourcing Services	4th
50	496	*	KKR	New York	4,150	$7,273	Securities	9th
* = not among Fortune's Global 500; Sources: Fortune, Volume 183, Number 3 (June/July 2023) and Volume 184, Number 1 (August/September 2023); Fortune website; 50pros.com

== See also ==
- Economy of Long Island
- Economy of New York City
- Economy of the United States
- New York State Department of Financial Services
- New York State Department of Labor
