= Economy of Door County, Wisconsin =

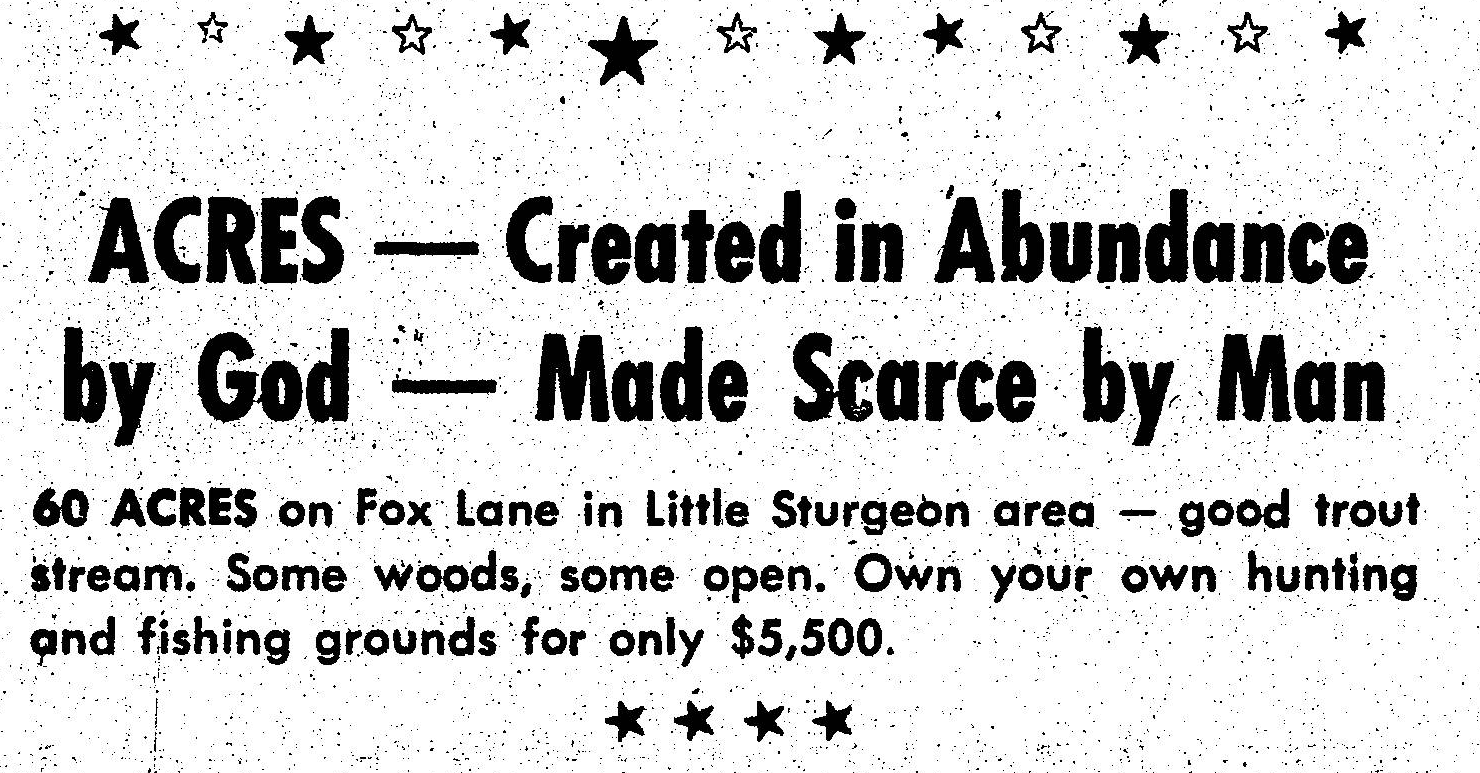
Adge from a 1970 real estate ad in the Door County Advocate. In 2019 figures, real estate and leasing was the largest sector of the county's economy.

The economy of Door County is similar to that of Bayfield, Iron, Oneida, Sawyer, and Vilas counties. These six northern Wisconsin counties have been categorized as having "forestry-related tourism"-based economies.

== By sector ==
=== Gross domestic product ===
An analysis comparing 1999 data for select Wisconsin counties found that Door County was especially strong in the retail of building and materials, groceries, apparel and accessories, miscellaneous retail, and restaurants. For services, it ranked strong in amusement, movie, and recreation and lodging. Door County ran a fiscal surplus in all categories to all other counties, with the exception of furniture & home furnishing, in which Door County had a leakage of sales to other counties. In January 2021, there were 1,263 private establishments for all industries put together, up from 919 establishments in January 1990, but down from a peak of 1,314 establishments in September 2005.

In 2020, the total gross domestic product (GDP) of the county in 2020 dollars was $1.39 billion, a 1.9% decrease from $1.42 billion in 2019. Out of 3,091 counties and county-level equivalents for which figures were available in 2020, Door County had the 1,297th largest economy. In 2019, the county's economy ranked 1,306th out of 3,090 counties. The per-capita GDP in 2020 was $46,370.

The largest out of fifteen different industry sector categories by total GDP generated was finance, insurance, real estate, rental, and leasing at $299 million, which accounted for 21.4% of the overall GDP. This sector was divided into two subsectors. Real estate and rental and leasing accounted for 18.7% of the county's GDP at $260 million, while finance and insurance accounted for 2.8% of the county's GDP at $38 million. The real estate and rental and leasing subsector declined 4.8 percent from 2019 to 2020, while manufacturing increased 0.2% to $274 million. Together, this resulted in manufacturing outpacing and overtaking real estate and rental and leasing in 2020 to become the county's leading individual subsector that year at 19.7% of the county's overall GDP.

Door County was one of 53 Wisconsin counties where manufacturing was a larger industry than real estate and rental and leasing. In 18 of Wisconsin's 72 counties, real estate and rental and leasing was larger than manufacturing. In Waushara County, figures for manufacturing were redacted in 2020 and it is not possible to determine which subsector was larger.

In 2001, the earliest year for which figures were compiled by the Bureau of Economic Analysis, GDP from real estate and rental and leasing in the county was $186 million in chained 2012 dollars. By 2020, the subsector grew to $210 million in chained 2012 dollars, for an increase of 12.9% over 19 years and an average of 0.68% growth each year. Using non-inflation-adjusted dollars, the sector gained 69.0% over the 19 years from 2001 to 2020, for an average annual gain of 3.6%.

2020 Door County GDP by category in non-inflation adjusted 2020 dollars
Manufacturing, $274 million
Real estate and rental and leasing, $260 million
Government and government enterprises, $157 million
Retail trade, $124 million
Arts, entertainment, recreation, accommodation,
and food services, $120 million
Health care and social assistance, $113 million
Construction, $81.0 million
Professional, scientific, and technical services
and management of companies and enterprises, $50.3 million
Other services (except government and government enterprises), $44.3 million
Finance and insurance, $38.6 million
Agriculture, forestry, fishing, and hunting, $38.2 million
Administrative and support and waste management
and remediation services, $26.7 million
Information, $23.7 million
Wholesale trade, $21.2 million
Transportation and warehousing, $11.8 million
Utilities, $5.12 million
Educational services, $4.23 million
Mining and quarrying, $0.350 million

=== Taxable sales ===
From 2020, Wisconsin Department of Revenue figures, the five largest annual sources of taxable sales were motor vehicle and parts dealers, food services and drinking places, accommodation, nonstore retailers, and building material and garden equipment and supplies dealers. Together they together accounted for 47.3% of all taxable sales in the county.

From 2019 to 2020, Department of Revenue figures, the total value of all taxable rental and leasing services in the county increased 18.8% in non-inflation adjusted, current-year dollars, while the total value of all taxable real estate sold in the county decreased 20.0% during the same time period. Only three areas had a greater percent decrease than real estate that year. Taxable telecommunications sales decreased 24.7%, but this was a result of a legal change which eliminated certain taxes. Taxable computer and electronic product manufacturing sales decreased by 23.8% and taxable machinery manufacturing sales decreased by 22.8%. The largest increases in taxable sales was seen in transportation equipment manufacturing, which gained 203.7%, professional, scientific, and technical services, which gained 90.0%, and nonstore retailers, which gained 80.6%.

=== Real estate ===
==== Housing cost and supply ====
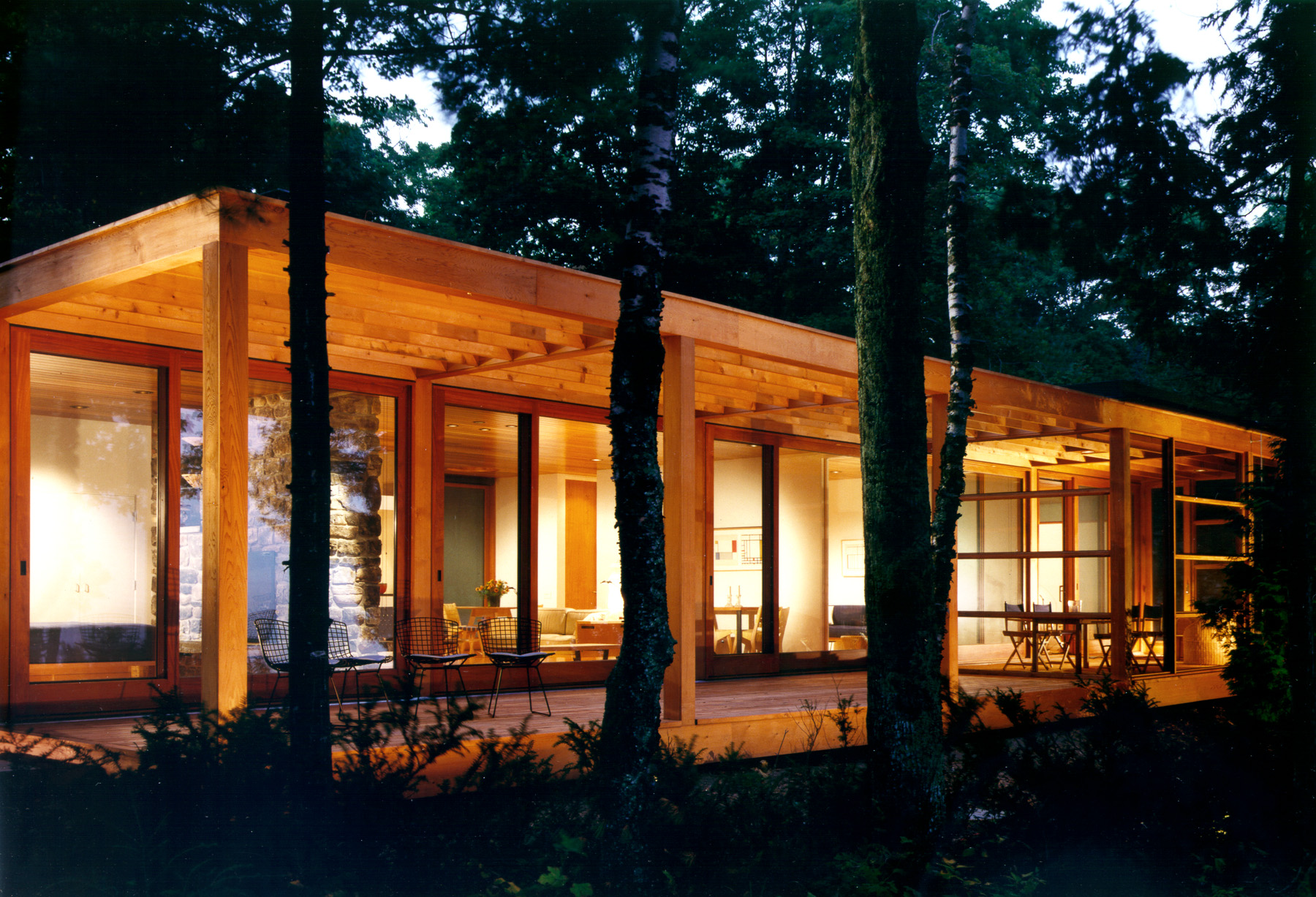
A cottage along Lake Michigan

Between 2000 and 2017, prices for houses in Door County rose only 1.3% annually, less than the U.S. average of 2.5%. The price of houses in the county increased 178% from January 1986 to January 2020. compared to a 235% increase for the state as a whole. Median home price in the county for 2021 was $315,000, with the highest sale volume since at least the 1970s.

According to the 2000 census, 6,201 housing units (30.7%) in the county were built before 1950, 6,580 units (33.6%) were built between 1950 and 1979, and 6,806 units (35.7%) were built between 1980 and 2000, for a total of 19,587 housing units. From 2000 through January 1, 2020, 5,561 new private housing structures have been authorized by building permits. Building permits for new housing structures peaked in 1999 with 527 permits issued and have since declined, with 139 permits issued in 2020. In 2006, nonresidents paid about 60% of the property taxes in the northern half of the county. According to the 2020 census, there were 23,738 housing units in the county. Of these, 13,989 (58.9%) were occupied and 9,749 (41.1%) were vacant. According to 2019, ACS five-year estimates, 46.9% of the housing units in the county were vacant, compared to 12.4% for the state as a whole. In 1960 there were 4,715 cottages or second homes in the county.

As residential and commercial land tend to require more government services than the property taxes they generate, these zones are subsidized by taxes on industrial, agricultural, and open lands. Although these zones may not necessarily have a high valuation, they generally require few government services and, as a result, in a net profit for the county. The demand for real estate in the county increased property prices, which in turn raised property assessments. Development pressure made some feel compelled to subdivide and sell their land, and the rising cost of taxes caused some to develop their land against their wishes. One seller was quoted in 1986 with this reflection: "I really don't have much choice but to sell it – I just can't keep up with it any more. If I don't sell it, I'm afraid my land valuation is going to go so high that I'll be taxed off of it anyhow." From 2006 to 2021, the increase in equalized value in real-dollar amounts was 85.7% for manufacturing, 45.8% for undeveloped land, 25% for productive forest, 10.59% for agricultural, and 19.2% for agricultural forest.

===== Shoreline development =====
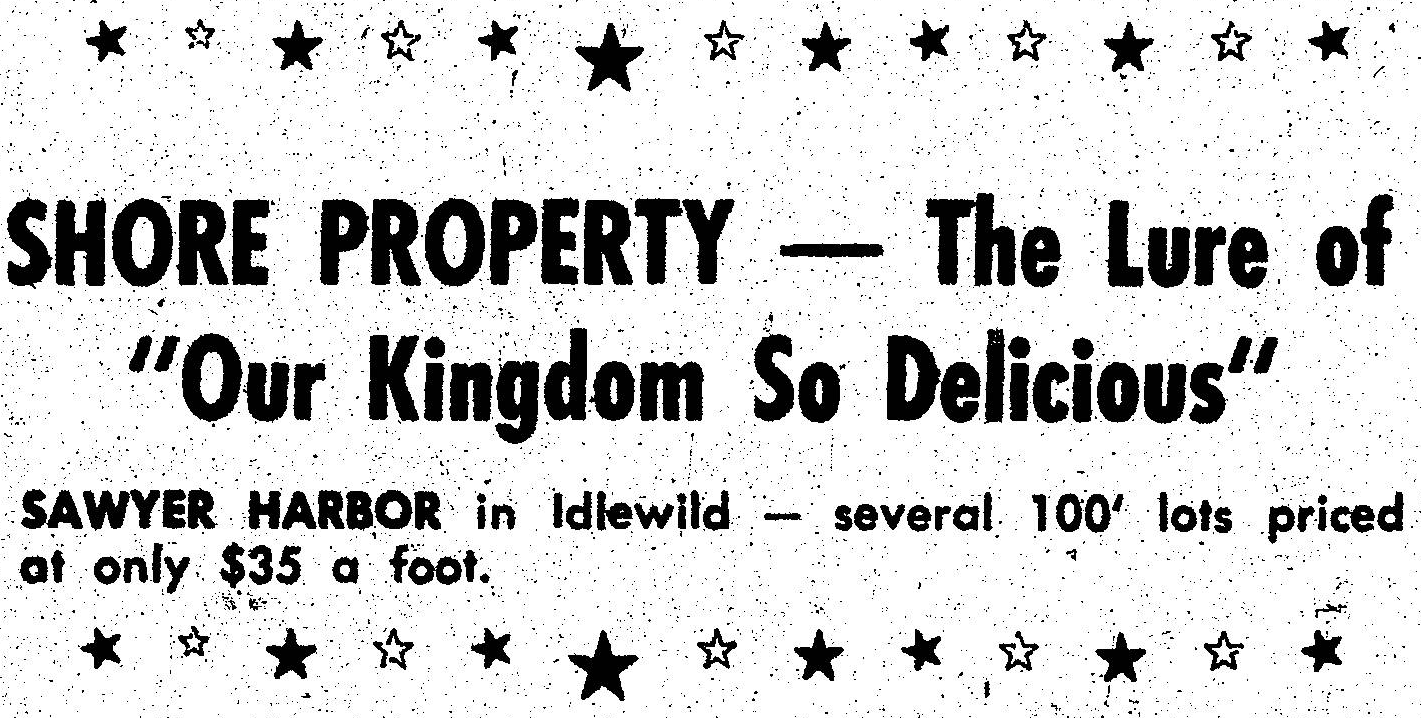
A 1970 advertisement from the Door County Advocate referencing a comment made by the French explorer Pierre-Esprit Radisson in 1665.

As of 2011, 7,889 residential buildings were located in within a one-fourth mile (400 meters) of the shore, some which form strip developments enclosing scenic areas. Out of 268 miles (431 km) miles of county shoreline along Lake Michigan and Green Bay surveyed in 2012, 164.4 miles (264.6 km) was developed for low-density residential use, 27.4 miles (44.1 km) for medium-density residential use, 16.9 miles (27.2 km) for commercial use, and 2.5 miles (4.0 km) for high-density residential use. 11.3 miles (18.2 km) was undeveloped forest and 45.7 miles (73.5 km) was located in parks. Out of the entire area surveyed, 42.9 miles (69.0 km) of the shore was replaced with artificial surfaces and 31.8 miles (51.2 km) was surrounded by manicured lawns. By 2012, 211.2 miles (339.9 km), or 78.7% of the 268 miles (431 km) of total shoreline surveyed was developed, an increase from 1964 when only 66.7 miles (107.3 km) had been developed.

Although the Army Corps of Engineers considered most of Green Bay shore and the entire Lake Michigan shore from Baileys Harbor northwards to be non-erodable in 1971, shoreline developments may still be vulnerable to erosion and destruction from ice shoves. Seiches on Green Bay cycle about every 11 hours but are highly variable and are capable of reversing the flow of water from rivers.

The lay of the land reduces the area of floodplains on the west side of the county north of the canal. The city of Sturgeon Bay, the eastern side of the town of Sevastopol, and the towns of Gardner, Nasewaupee, Sturgeon Bay, Forestville, Jacksonport, and Baileys Harbor consist of floodplain to a greater degree than the rest of the county. From 1996 to 2010 an additional 171 acres (69 ha) of land within FEMA designated floodplains was developed. From the spring of 1951 through April 1952, high water damage to existing protective structures in Sturgeon Bay was estimated at $151,000 and damage to other improvements on shore properties and in the water was estimated at $94,000. The value of land lost to erosion was estimated at $21,300 and damage to crops or improvements due to flooding was estimated at $27,000. Altogether this totaled $293,300 in damages within Sturgeon Bay; high water damages in the rest of the county were estimated at $100,000, with $393,300 in total estimated damages throughout the county. The total value of improvements vulnerable to future high water incidents was estimated at $1,465,700. Major flooding occurred in 1973; high lake levels and storm damage cost an estimated $24 million. Between 1978 and July 2012 there were 238 flood insurance policies issued within the county. During these years there were 34 National Flood Insurance Program claims totaling of $180,031. A flash flood in Ephraim in 2017 caused $75,000 in damage and four flooding incidents on the lakeshore from 2019 to 2020 caused $80,000 in damage.

According to the county Land Use Services director, shoreline parcels are frequently listed for sale at almost twice of their tax assessed value. Shoreline parcels tend to be the most highly valued real estate and are typically owned by non-Wisconsin residents unless they are public property.

In 1964, the Door County Board of Supervisors Comprehensive Planning Program stated an opinion in the county's development plan against strip development of the shoreline, and instead advocated cluster development:

By dividing up all 121 miles of presently undeveloped shoreline in the county into 150-foot lots, about 4,200 cottage sites could be provided. The public in this case would be limited to the already overcrowded shoreline of existing parks: and with increasing visitor pressure, these areas would in time become outdoor slums. The adverse effects on general tourism in the county would be severe; transient visitors who came to sightsee, or enjoy the parks and scenery, and who might stay a night or two in the county (and spend considerable money in total), would have increasingly less reason to visit Door County.

and also:

One development possibility is to sliver the remaining shoreline into private lots. This would severely limit public use of the shores and would make the interior area virtually land locked—seriously impairing its development potential. If in addition, the quality of the shoreline were destroyed (trees cut, hills leveled, ground bulldozed, beaches filled) to make development easier, the desirability of much of the area would be lost... a second possibility...is to reserve certain outstanding resource areas as public lands and to encourage clustering of private development along shorelines near existing communities and municipal services and in accordance with good development standards.

In August 1971, the Army Corps of Engineers completed a shoreline use survey:

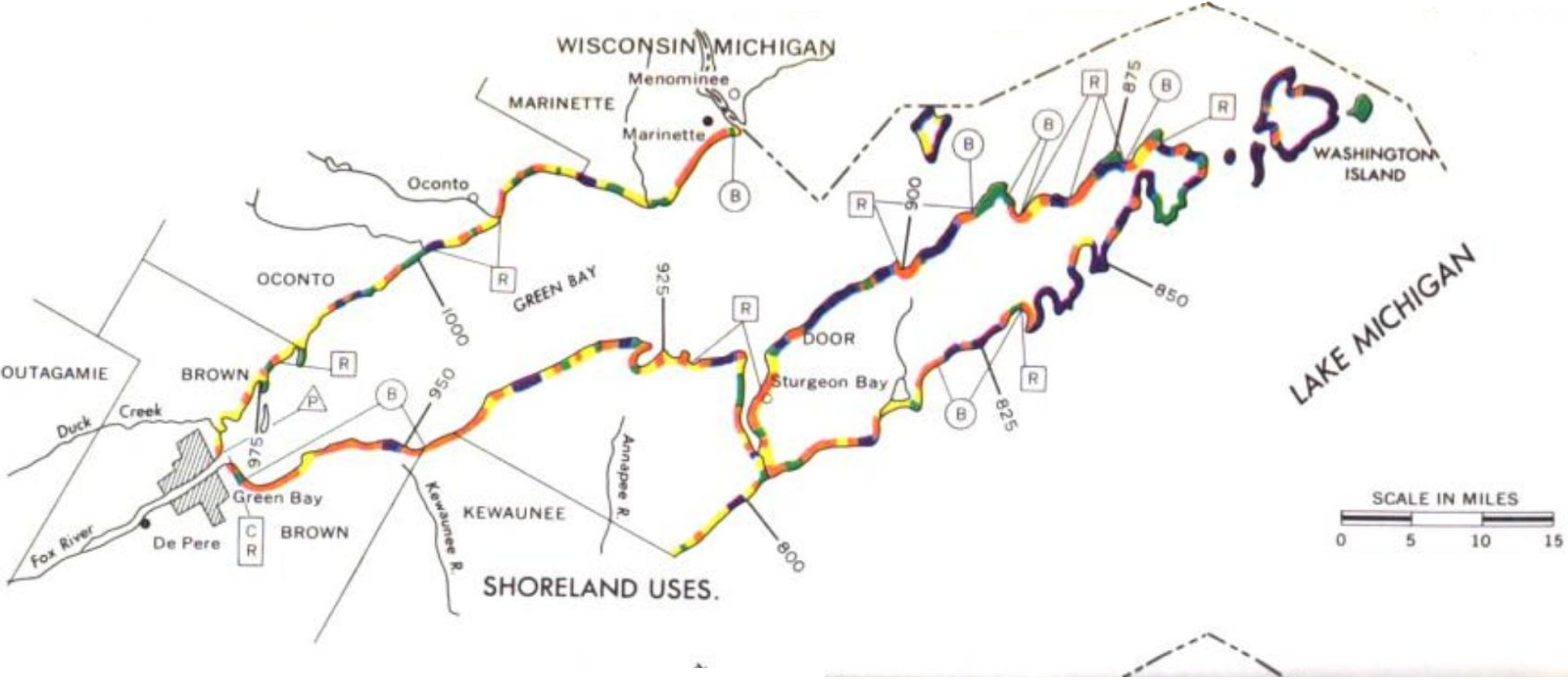
Shoreline uses, published August 1971 Commercial, industrial, residential, and public buildings Recreational and urban open space Agricultural and undeveloped Forest

In 1973, County Planner Robert Florence gave a response to a question about to cluster developments:

I continually advocate that approach. No one listens to me... The county has a general development plan, but it's pretty old. It's outdated. It was good for its time, I suppose. I find criticism with it in that it was primarily an inventory and not really a plan. But it's old and it hasn't been updated. It becomes difficult since it is so old to point to it with any authority and say: "Look. This is a general development plan which the county board adopted back in 19 such-and-such. This outlines the direction that we're going to go. We don't have the kind of document that we can point to with authority and say, "No, Mr. So and So. Your development doesn't fit the scheme."

By 1976, almost all desirable shoreline properties in the county had been subdivided, particularly those with sandy beaches, but at the time not all of the new lots had been sold off or built up. Charles Prentice for the Wisconsin Coastal Management Program noted:

Door County and other unique recreational areas could become overdeveloped and unrecreational. To avoid this, at some point in the process, there is a need for public decisions and the degree to which particular areas should be developed and the degree to which they should remain rural and leisurely in character. Unless these decisions are made, the coastal and other recreational areas will be developed without consideration of important factors which do not receive weight in a free market decision-making process. If this is the case, it is highly likely that many of the results will be looked upon as quite unfortunate.

==== Effects of high property values ====
In 2017 the county had the second highest property values per capita in the state. Property values are high because of the effects of tourism. In 1970, a study using 1968 data found that tourism boosts property tax revenues in two ways. One way is through direct tax payments made by seasonal residents and the other way is through the cumulative impacts of tourism which raise the assessed property values for other properties. For every dollar received in the county in tax from seasonal residents an additional $5.30 was received due to the impact of tourism on property assessments for other properties. Combined, this meant that local governments received 17% more property tax revenue than they would have without tourism.

The high property values combined with low enrollment serve to punish local school districts in the state funding formula. Since 1959, the Wisconsin Department of Public Instruction has wanted more school consolidation in Door County in order to achieve their statewide goal of having every district supported by a large tax base and offering a sufficiently comprehensive high school program. However, only the Southern Door School District complied with the DPI's expectations by consolidating into a single site in 1962. On June 17, 1976, the county board passed an ordinance forbidding school districts in the county from complying with state law regarding negative school aid, which required wealthier school districts to fund less wealthy districts. Three of the county's five school districts were affected by the law. The state argued that districts with tiny mill rates needed to pay their fair share to the state and that negative aid would provide equal education to children. The opposing side cited local control of schools, the need for taxing entities to take responsibility for raising taxes, and the rights of school districts to provide more than a minimum education as reasons against negative state aid. Following a November 30, 1976 decision by the Wisconsin Supreme Court that negative school aid was unconstitutional, the Washington Island School District declared a holiday to celebrate. As a result of the state funding formula, the county's school districts often have referendums for additional property tax funding.

For forested lands, high property values drive up property tax levies, which in turn encourages landowners to enroll their land in the Managed Forest Program to reduce their taxes.

==== Effects of protected areas on nearby development ====
A 2012 report found that Door County's preserved open spaces reduced the likelihood that nearby land would be subdivided, but if it was subdivided, areas near the open space were divided into more parcels than those further away. It did not appear to affect agriculture-related development.

=== Tourism ===
==== Comparison of two sub-sectors ====
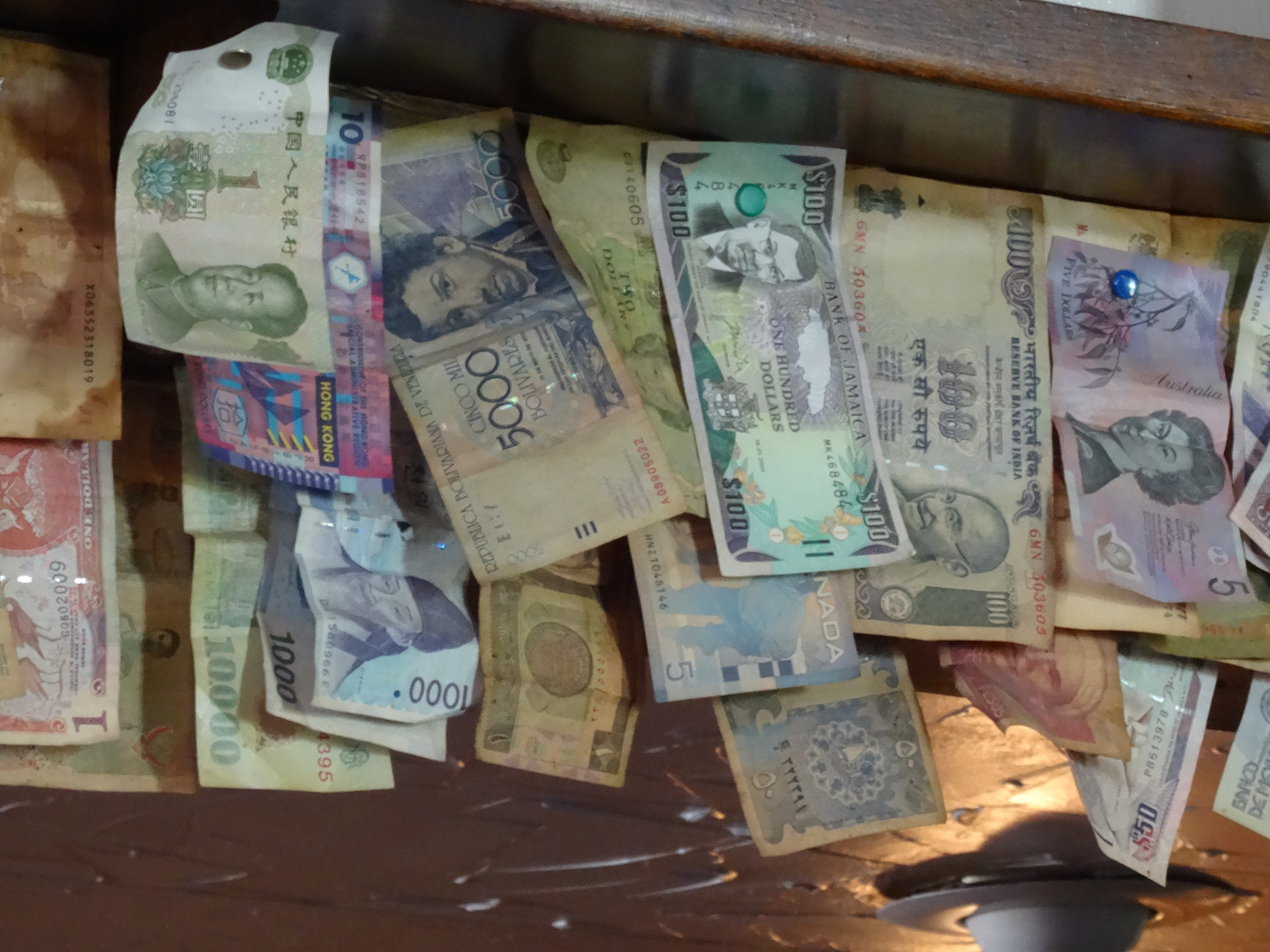
Bills pinned up at Nelsen's Hall on Washington Island

In 2020, the arts, entertainment, recreation, accommodation, and food services sector contributed $120 million to the county's GDP in non-inflation adjusted 2020 dollars.

Using inflation-adjusted chained 2012 dollars, the sector shrank 13.8% over the 19 years from 2001 to 2020, with an average contraction of 0.72% per year. In non-inflation adjusted current-year dollars, the sector grew 51.1% over the 19 years from 2001 to 2020, with an average growth of 2.7% per year.

The Bureau of Economic Analysis subdivides the arts, entertainment, recreation, accommodation, and food services sector into two smaller sub-sectors. The arts, entertainment, and recreation subsector accounted for 15.1% of the total combined sector at $18 million in 2020 dollars. The other sub-sector was accommodation and food services, which in 2020 accounted for 84.9% of the total combined sector at $102 million in 2020 dollars. The definition used for food services only includes "meals, snacks, and beverages for immediate consumption" rather than food sold at groceries, farm stands, and farmers' markets.

In inflation-adjusted chained 2012 dollars, arts, entertainment, and recreation grew 51% over the six years from 2001 to 2007 when it peaked at the highest value recorded by the BEA. From 2007 to 2020 the sector contracted 34% over 13 years, with 2020 having the lowest value recorded by the BEA. Altogether from 2001 to 2020 the sector grew 0.29% over the 19-year period, for an average of 0.015% growth per year in inflation-adjusted chained 2012 dollars. In non-inflation adjusted current-year dollars, the sub-sector grew 64% over the 19-year period, for an average of 3.4% growth per year.

In inflation-adjusted chained 2012 dollars, accommodation and food services grew 6.6% over the three years from 2001 to when it peaked in 2004 at the highest value recorded by the BEA. From the three years from 2004 through 2007 it contracted 13%. Over the four years from 2007 to 2011, it grew by 6.8% before contracting 5.3% over the two years from 2011 to 2013. From 2013 to 2019, it grew 13.3% over the six years. Over one year from 2019 to 2020 it contracted 21% Altogether from 2001 to 2020 the sector shrank 16% over the 19-year period, for an average contraction of 0.85% per year in inflation adjusted chained 2012 dollars. In non-inflation adjusted current-year dollars, the sub-sector grew 49% over the 19-year period, for an average of 2.6% growth per year.

==== Sales and spending ====
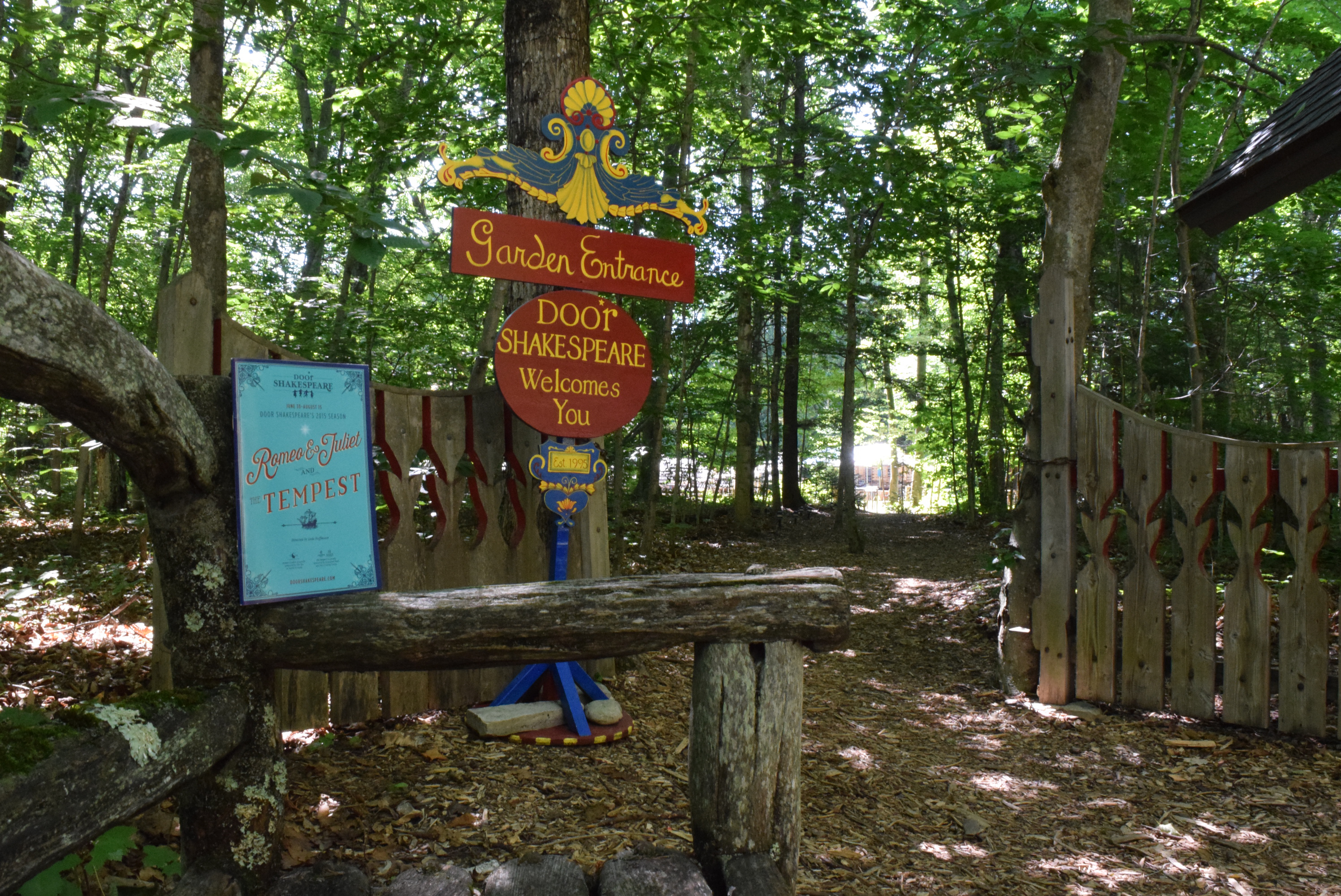
Playbill near the entrance of an outdoor theater in Baileys Harbor listing Romeo and Juliet and The Tempest as the shows for the 2015 acting season

Taxable sales for the amusement, gambling, and recreation industry grew 1.78% in non-inflation adjusted, current year dollars from 2019 to 2020, with both years seeing the most sales in July.

In 2020, 3.1% of all traveler expenditures in the state occurred in Door County.

In 2015, Door County arts and cultural organizations spent $9.7 million, of which 70.9% was spent locally, in addition to $15.0 million spent by attendees. An estimated 1,582 volunteers for arts and cultural organizations averaged 35.7 hours each. In 2015, 194,424 people attended arts and cultural events in the county, 78.0% of them non-residents. In 2016, the average arts event attendee from the county spent $28.96, while the average nonresident spent $90.53. In 2016, 50.6% of non-residents said the arts event was the primary reason they made the trip to the county. 66.0% of county resident attendees in 2016 were 65 or older, while 48.6% of non-resident attendees were 65 or older.

Survey responses from arts and cultural organizations in the county from March 13, 2020, to February 15, 2021, estimated that the organizations would lose $10,035,156 due to the impacts of coronavirus, with a median loss of $146,250 per organization. There were forty organizations recorded as existing in the county.

==== Tourist-oriented businesses ====
In 2016, 36.1% of all employees in the county worked at establishments with less than twenty employees, the eighth-most in the state. 82.6% of establishments had less than twenty employees, the fourth-highest percentage in the state. In 2003, researchers found that compared to other Wisconsin counties, Door County had a middling amount of inland water acreage, forestland, county-owned acreage, and rail trail mileage and a high number of golf courses, amusement businesses, (Note: such as go-kart tracks, water parks, and mini-golf) and campgrounds. Despite the high number of campgrounds the Wisconsin DNR in 2006 reported that "demand for camping far exceeds current supply."

In 1970, a study analyzed 1968 data and found that tourist-oriented businesses in the county tend to earn relatively little due to the multiplier effect from other sectors in the county; certain other sectors were more dependent on one another while tourist-oriented businesses were more dependent on tourists.

==== Comparison of tourism and manufacturing employment ====
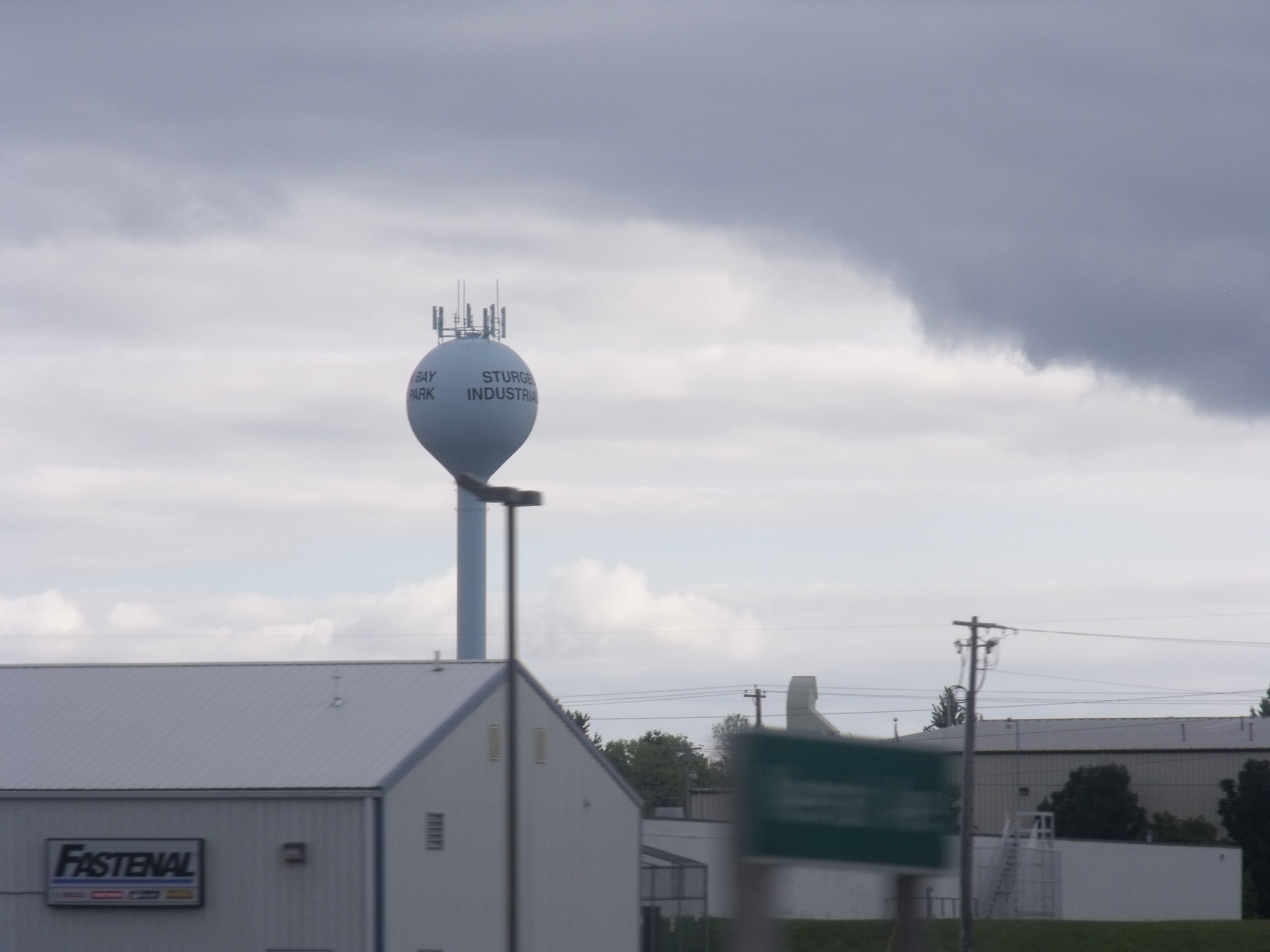
Sturgeon Bay Industrial Park

Manufacturing employment in the county is more stable and less seasonal than tourist employment. 22.0% of the county's 13,728 employed workers (Note: Excluding unreported workers) in 2018 served in the leisure and hospitality sector, more than any other sector. However, because leisure and hospitality jobs tend not to pay very well, they only earned 12.9% of all wages earned in the county. In contrast, manufacturing employees received 24.5% of the wages paid in 2018, even though they only made up 17.0% of the workforce. This is despite the average annual wage for leisure and hospitality workers being 109.3% of the state average wage for leisure and hospitality in 2018. In contrast, workers employed in manufacturing received 86.7% of the state average wage for manufacturing. Wages in Door County trailed state averages for every sector except leisure and hospitality.

From 2018 to 2019, leisure and hospitability grew 0.1% and manufacturing grew 0.2%. There were 2,683 leisure and hospitability jobs in 2020, with a gain of 2 jobs from the previous year. There were 2,298 manufacturing jobs in 2020, with a gain of 4 jobs from the previous year. From 2019 to 2020, leisure and hospitability contracted 12.7% and manufacturing contracted 4.7%. There were 2,341 leisure and hospitability jobs in 2020, with a loss of 342 jobs from the previous year. There were 2,189 manufacturing jobs in 2020, with a loss of 109 jobs from the previous year.

=== Utilities ===
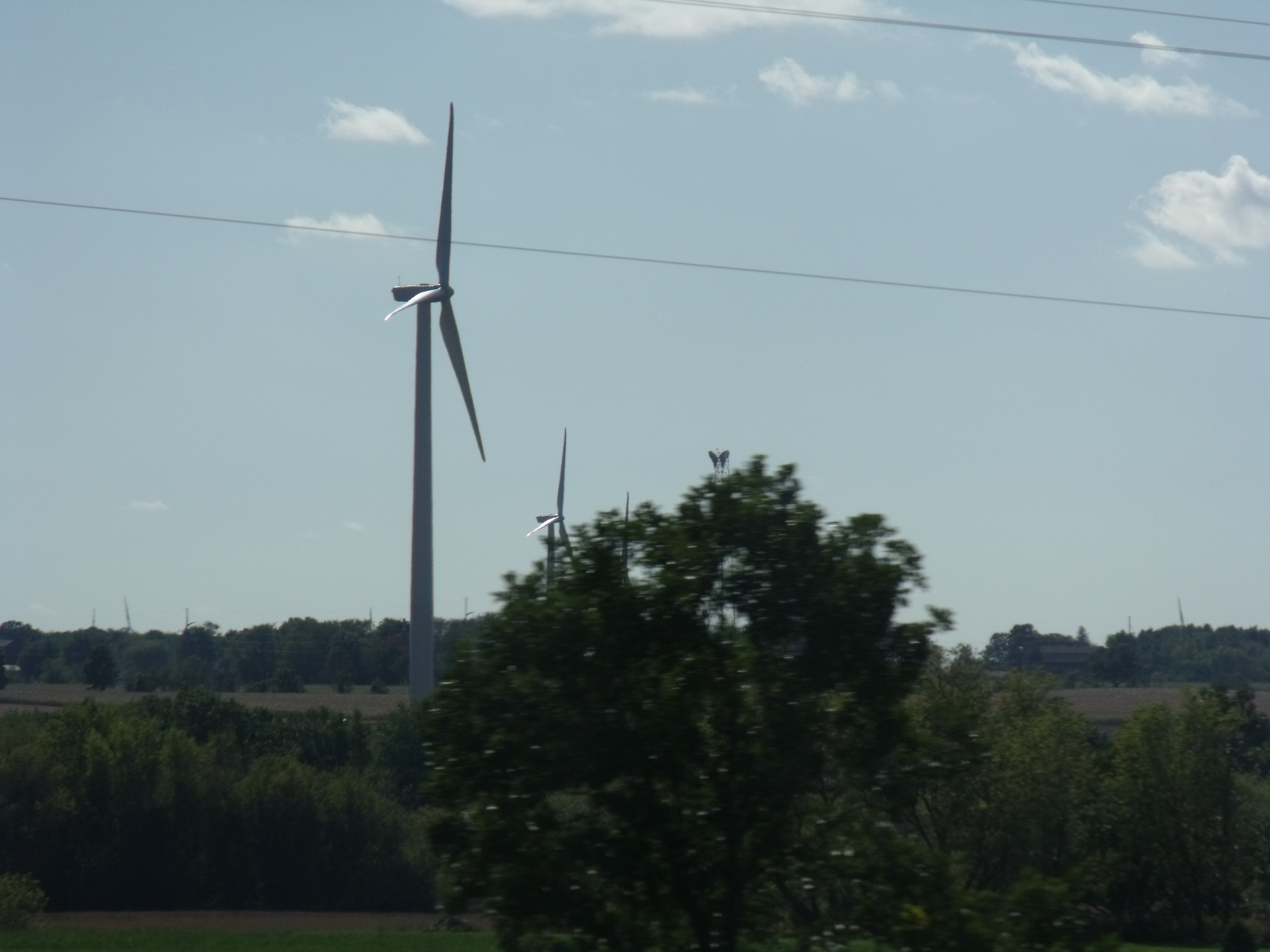
Rosiere Wind Farm

From 2001 to 2020 in inflation-adjusted dollars, the GDP of the utilities sector grew 1,193%, averaging an annual 63% increase over the 19 years, making utilities the fastest growing sector for which statistics were available. The second fastest growing sector was the information industry which grew 184% overall and averaged 9.7% growth per year. In real, non-inflation adjusted dollars, the utilities industry expanded from $292,000 in 2001 to $5.12 million in 2020, an increase of 1,653% over the 19 years with an average annual increase of 87%.

A wind turbine project crossing the county line on the Niagara Escarpment was completed in 1999. At the time the 30.5-acre (12.3-ha) Rosiere Wind Farm was the largest in the eastern United States. Since the retirement of the Kewaunee Power Station in Carlton and the J. P. Pulliam Generating Station in Green Bay, power to Door County is primarily from the gas-powered plant in De Pere (Brown County) owned by SkyGen and the Point Beach Nuclear Plant in Kewaunee County. An exception to this is Chambers Island, which has no electrical grid system.

=== Non-metallic mining and agriculture ===
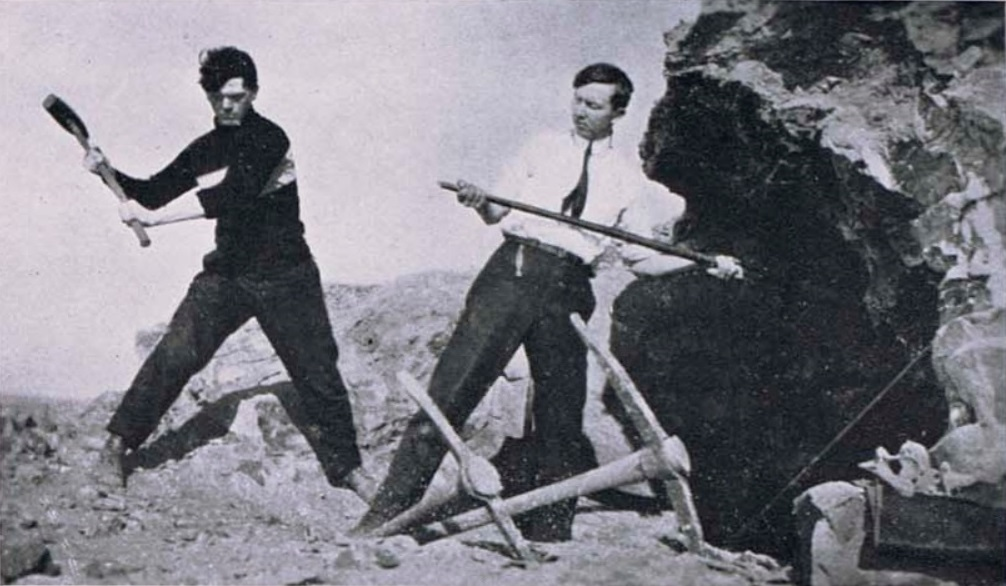
Mr. John Backey (right), Manual Training teacher at Sturgeon Bay High School, demonstrates the use of the chisel during the 1915–1916 school year.

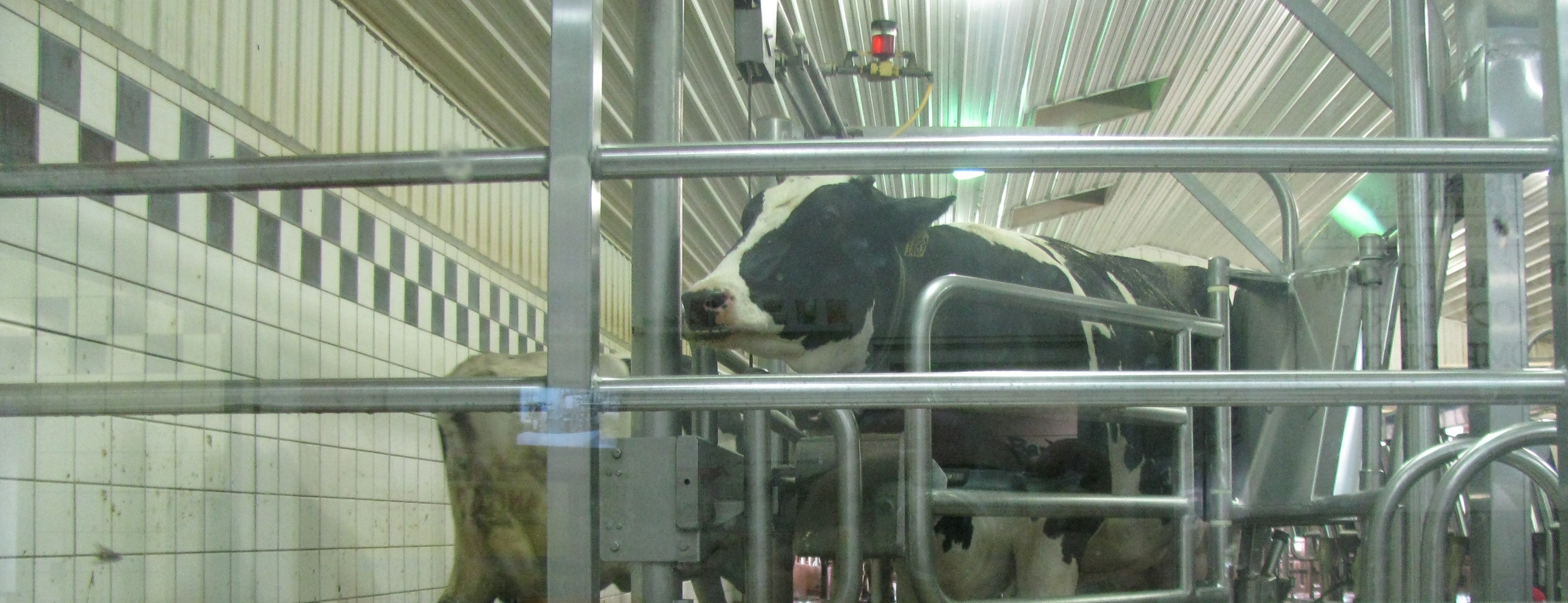
A milking parlor in Sevastopol

In 2020, the smallest contributor measured to the county's GDP was the mining and quarrying industry at $0.35 million in current-year dollars. From 2019 to 2020, mining added 19 new jobs for a total of 215 jobs in 2020.

The prevalence of shallow soils and exposed bedrock hinders agriculture but is beneficial for mining. As of 2016, there are 16 active gravel pits and quarries in the county. They produce sand, gravel, and crushed rock for roadwork and construction use. Six of them are county-owned and produce 75,000 cubic yards annually.

Minerals found in Door County include fluorite, gypsum, calcite, dolomite, quartz, marcasite, and pyrite. Crystals may be found in vugs.

On three occasions in the early 1900s oil was found within a layer of shale in the middle and southern part of the county. Additionally, solid bitumen has been observed in dolomite exposed along the Lake Michigan shore. Drilling near Maplewood in 1950, in Union from 1950 to 1951, in the town of Sturgeon Bay in 1951, and west of Baileys Harbor in 1972 yielded no oil. In the 1970s, oil leases were sold in the towns of Forestville, Union, Brussels, Gardner, and Baileys Harbor, but no oil was produced.

In 2020, the GDP of the agriculture, forestry, fishing, and hunting industry was $38.2 million in current-year dollars. In 2018, 430 income tax returns filed by county residents included farm income or expenses, down by 23.6% from 2011 when 563 returns included farm income or expenses.

Agricultural land use in Door County reached its peak in 1920, when 264,126 acres were farmed, representing 85.6% of the county's total land area. In 1944, there were 158,063 acres (63,966 ha) of cropland and 76,775 acres (31,070 ha) of pastures in the county. In 2017, there were 90,126 acres (36,473 ha) of cropland and 6,602 acres (2,672 ha) of pasture, with cropland declining 43.0% and pastures declining 91.4%. The total decline in both cropped and pastured farmland was 58.8% over the seventy-three years. From 2020 to 2017, the total decline for farmland was 63.4% over ninety-seven years, with an average decline of 0.65% per year.

In 1970, a study compiled what each industry received in sales in 1968, how it spent the money, and where the money went after it was spent. Out of all sectors, the combined agriculture, mining, forestry, and fishing sector funneled money to entities within the county more than any other sector. Each dollar in sales made by agriculture, mining, forestry, and fishing resulted in $3.02 more in total sales within the county. For every dollar spent by agriculture, mining, forestry, and fishing, 32 cents was received by other agriculture, mining, forestry, and fishing entities and the rest went to other sectors.

Both sale prices and rental values of agricultural land are lower than most Wisconsin counties. The most important field crops by acres harvested in 2017 were hay and haylage at 25,197 acres (10,197 ha), soybeans at 16,790 acres (6,790 ha), corn (grain) at 15,371 acres (6,220 ha), corn (silage) at 9,314 acres (3,769 ha), wheat at 8,790 acres (3,560 ha), oats at 2,610 acres (1,060 ha), and barley at 513 acres (208 ha). Despite lower productivity for other forms of agriculture, in the early 1900s the combination of thin soils and fractured bedrock was described by area promoters as beneficial to fruit horticulture, as the land would quickly drain during wet conditions and provide ideal soil conditions for orchard trees. For apples, the influence of the calcium-rich dolomite on the soil was expected to promote good color.

In 2018, there were an estimated 23,500 head of cattle in the county. In 2017, Door and Kewaunee counties were reported to have equal deer-to-human ratios, although Kewaunee County had a considerably greater cow-to-human ratio.

The Evergreen Nursery in Sturgeon Bay was founded in 1864. It first consisted of pulling wild evergreens and exporting them via Goodrich steamboats. As of 2021, it was the largest wholesale nursery in the state.

== County finances ==
=== Revenues ===
County spending in Door County is supported by property taxes, sales taxes, and state aid. In 2017, the county had the highest per capita property tax burden in the state, although when compared by amount levied per $1,000 of property the tax was comparatively low with the county having the fifteenth lowest per capita property tax rate per $1,000 out of all 72 Wisconsin counties. The county collected $154.12 in per capita sales taxes in 2020, the highest in the state, with an average annual increase of 3.62% in non-inflation adjusted, current-year dollars from 2003 when it collected $95.38 per capita and ranked second-highest in the state. It also received the ninth highest level of per capita state financial assistance to the county government in 2015 figures.

=== Expenses ===
Expenses of the Door County Tourism Zone Commission, 2008–2020

In 2014, Door County spent $11,287 per resident on advertising and other forms of tourism promotion, the second-most per capita of any Wisconsin county. 30% of the expenses reflected in this graph are refunds to individual municipalities collecting the tax. The municipalities are not required to spend this money on tourism promotion.

In 2015, Door County had the third-highest level of per capita county spending in Wisconsin. It was Wisconsin's only county with high per capita government spending in 2005 that did not also have a large low-income population. High per capita county government spending in Wisconsin is typically due to poverty. Door County's spending can be explained by both the need to provide services to people present only during the tourism season and by development patterns.

A 2004 study showed that residential and commercial land tends to require more in government services than property taxes generate. These in turn are subsidized by taxes on industrial, agricultural, and open lands, which generally require few government services. The residential share of the county's overall assessed value increased from 66.65% in 1984 to 85.22% in 2021, while the commercial share decreased from 11.57% to 10.18% over the same time period. In 2021, the residential share of the county's overall valuation was the 6th largest out of all Wisconsin counties, and the commercial share was the 41st largest. In contrast, manufacturing, agriculture, agricultural forest, productive forest, and undeveloped land ranked 65th, 63rd, 50th, 48th, 50th largest respectively out of all 72 Wisconsin counties.

The dispersal of residential developments is also a factor. A 2002 study found that Wisconsin town residents are typically subsidized by city and village residents. In addition to the dispersal of structures, the population density per housing unit is also low for the state. The effect of seasonal residents on persons-per-housing unit figures was once masked by larger family sizes among year-round inhabitants. Beginning in the 1980 census the number of persons per housing unit fell below typical figures for Wisconsin as the number of children in the county dropped.

== Carrying capacity ==
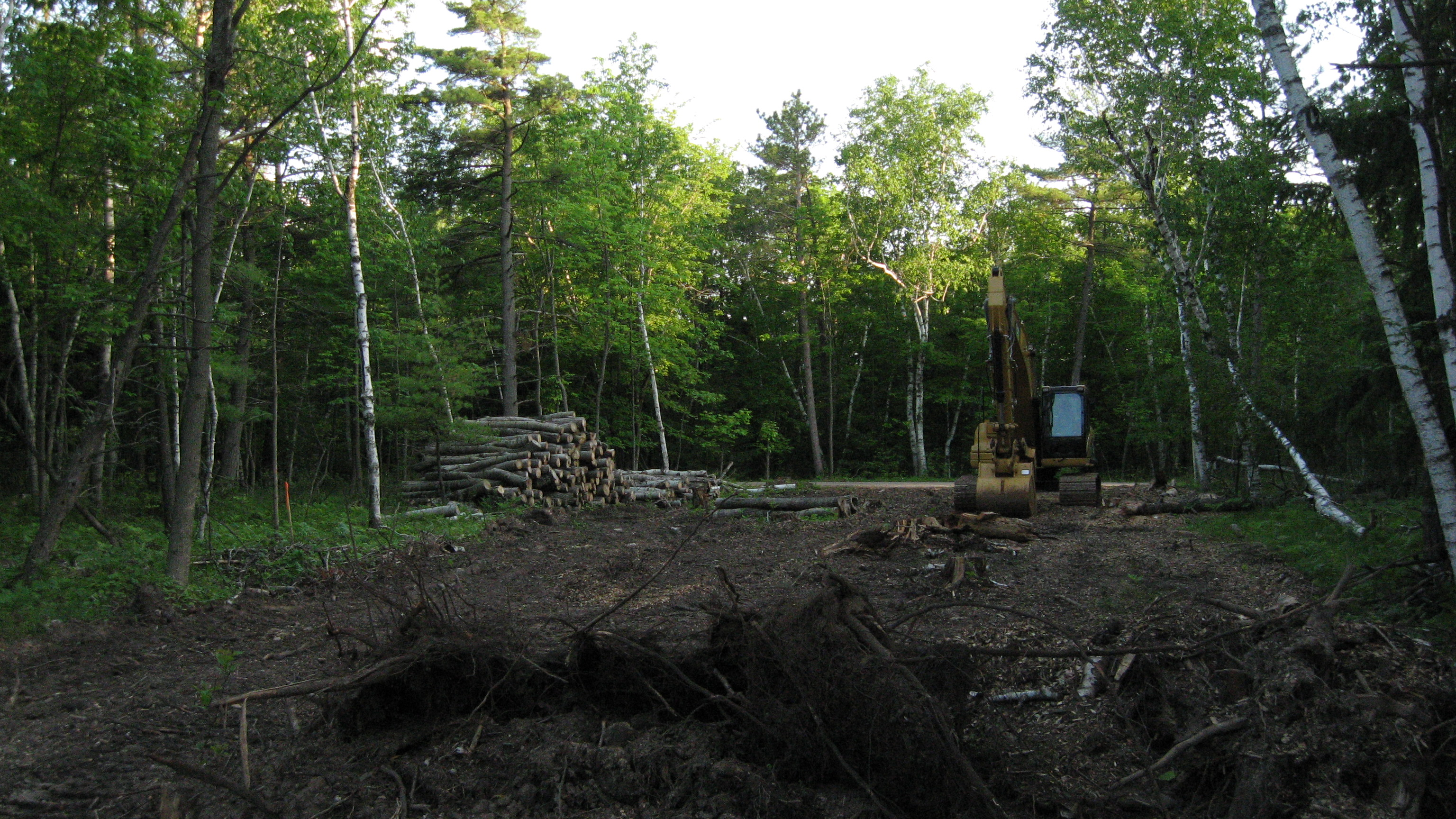
Camground construction in Potawatomi State Park, 2008; the overnight capacity of the park increased by 120 persons due to this project.

Attempts at estimating the carrying capacity of the county have been made in a variety of different ways. In 1964, the Door County Board of Supervisors Comprehensive Planning Program estimated the public beach capacity of the county at between 3,500 and 7,000 persons, and projected the need to acquire "roughly one and one-half miles of new beach by 1980 and an additional six and three-fourth miles by 2000" to prevent overcrowding. The same plan also projected a need to acquire more state park lands to accommodate a tripling or quadrupling of peak tourist traffic by the year 2000: "11,000-12,000 acres of new state park lands will be needed by 1980, and another 9,000-10,000 acres by the year 2000." Newport State Park was founded in accordance with this plan.

One alternative proposed to constructing what later became Newport State Park was for the state to construct additional campsites at Peninsula State Park instead. In response, a representative for the Wisconsin Department of Natural Resources responded that "Only so much development is possible before you destroy the natural beauty for which the area was preserved in the first place. You can't put a campsite in every clearing and a picnic table behind every tree." In 1976 the county board blocked the DNR from expanding the park or purchasing the Pine Ledges along the North Bay. In addition, the DNR's attempt to acquire Detroit Island in its entirety for a state park in 1978 was thwarted by the Detroit Island Landowners' Association and local governments.

In 1984, Jim Cook, an Egg Harbor business owner, stated that the carrying capacity was limited by the degree of pollution in the county. He thought that if development was uncontrolled, the population would be limited by poor environmental quality to no more than a 50% increase of what it currently was, but if development was controlled the population could increase threefold. During the 1980 census the county had a population of 25,029. In a 2008 survey of county residents, the most frequent local concern was the need to control rampant overdevelopment, including condos. In 2021, Ryan Heise, former Egg Harbor village administrator, stated that it was selfish to think Door County was currently at its tourist carrying capacity.

== Seasonality ==
=== The tourist influx ===
Although Door County has a year-round population of 30,066, it experiences an influx of tourists each summer between Memorial Day and Labor Day, with over 2.1 million visitors per year. Most businesses are targeted to tourism and operate seasonally. According to Wisconsin Department of Revenue figures, taxable accommodations industry sales peaked in July in both 2019 and 2020, and room tax collections from 2017 to 2018 also peaked in July, although sales tax revenue was higher in August. The fewest room taxes from 2017 to 2018 were collected for January, and the fewest sales taxes were collected for April. From 2015 to 2020, 9-1-1 calls made by non-residents peaked in July.

Room occupancy for motels, resorts, and inns in Door County, July 2018 – December 2020

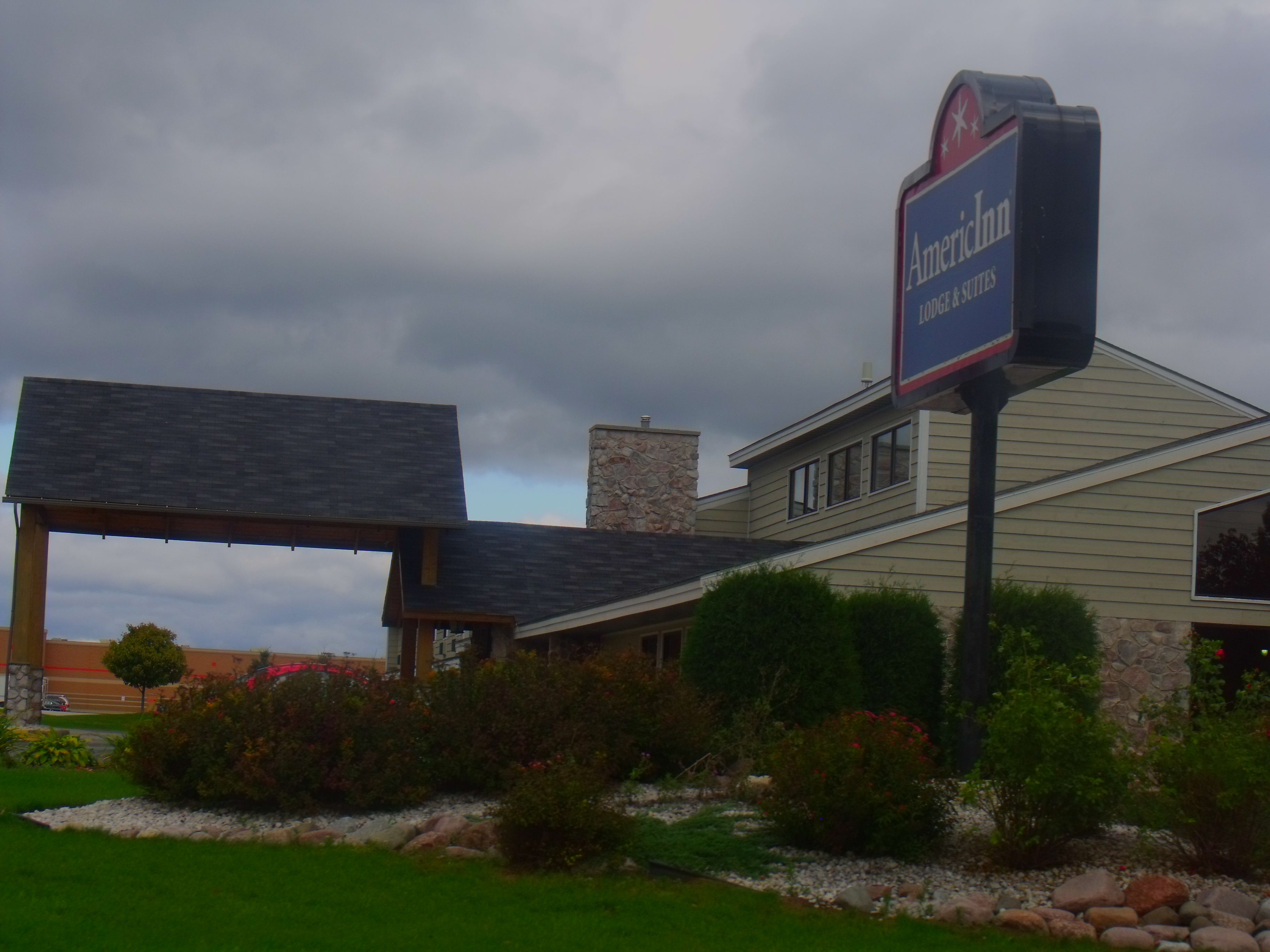
A motel, Sturgeon Bay, October 2009

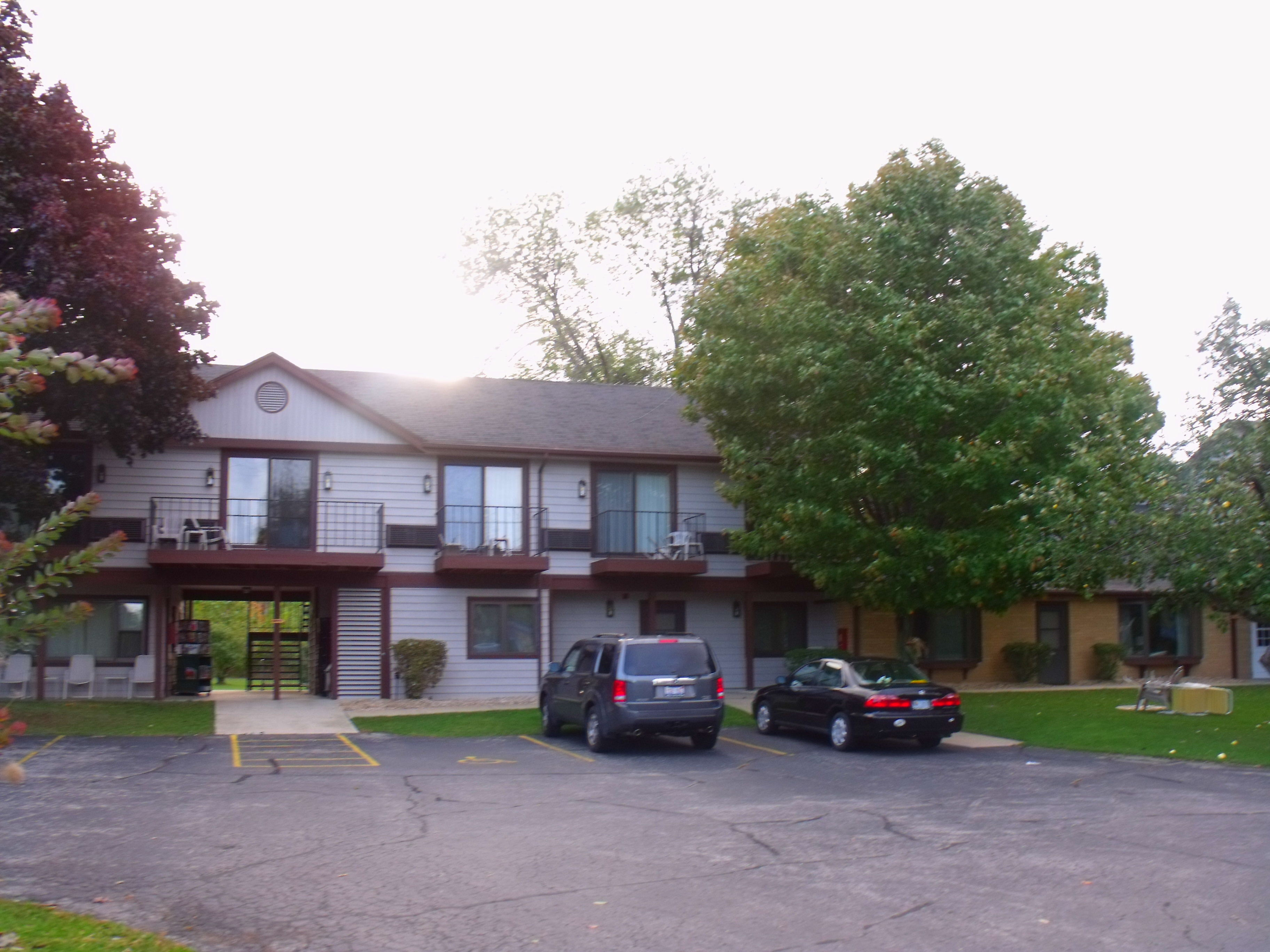
An inn, Egg Harbor, October 2009

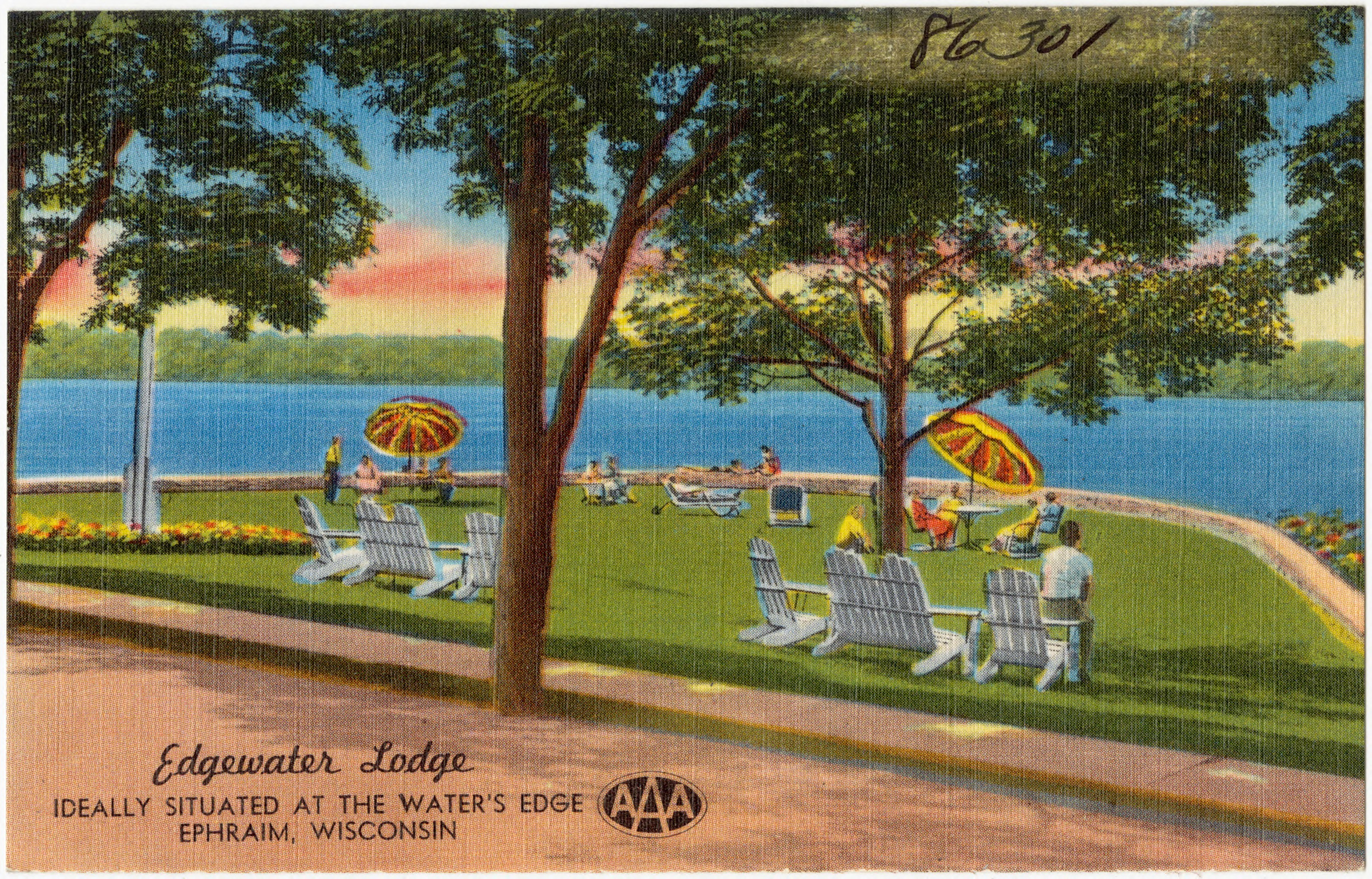
A resort, Ephraim, printed between circa 1930 and circa 1945; in 1976 those staying at hotels and resorts were thought to spend more in the county overall, and to spend it in manners which caused more overall economic activity.

=== Employment ===
Door County unemployment rates during the summer and fall are considerably lower than in winter. Annual earnings in Door County are typically less than similar jobs in other areas of Wisconsin. This has been attributed to the seasonal nature of much of the employment. In 2009 it was found that people were 4.85 times more likely to be employed by hotels and motels in Door County as opposed to the rest of the nation.

Homes, cabins, and cottages permitted for short term rentals, 2008 – May 2021

=== Labor and housing shortages ===
Total employment in the county grew 1% from 2016 to 2017. From 2017 to 2018, employment shrank 0.12%, another 0.03% from 2018 to 2019, and another 7.12% from 2019 to 2020 for three consecutive years of contraction. The decrease in employment from 2019 to 2020 was the largest experienced in the county since at least 1976. The labor force also shrank during the three consecutive years from 2018 to 2020.

The effects of the low earnings are compounded by average housing prices; other areas in Wisconsin with low wages tend to have low housing prices. The unaffordability of housing has been linked to the labor shortage problem, as new employees may be unable to afford housing and decide to leave.

Based on 5-year ACS estimates, from January 2010 to January 2019 the percent of households in the county spending more than 30% of their income on housing fell from 37.4% to 24.3%. A 2019 study found the county to have the eighth highest cost of living out of all Wisconsin counties.

From 2018 to 2019 Internal Revenue Service figures, 337 tax returns migrated to the county from outside Wisconsin, 439 migrated to the county from other counties in Wisconsin. 303 tax returns migrated from the county to somewhere out-of-state but still within the United States. 382 migrated to another county in Wisconsin. No tax returns migrated in either direction between Door County and any foreign country. The average adjusted gross income was $62,934 for all migrating tax returns leaving the county and $78,589 for all migrating tax returns moving to the county. The average gross adjusted income of tax returns migrating out of the county reported income that was 86.5% of the income for returns in the county which did not migrate, and the average gross adjusted income of tax returns migrating into the county reported income that was 108.0% of the income for returns in the county which did not migrate.

Door County has fewer recently relocated residents than the state as a whole. According to ACS 5-year estimates for 2019, only 6.0% of household owners or renters in the county reported moving into their current residence since 2017 or later. 13.2% of household owners or renters moved in from 2015 to 2016, 20.1% moved in from 2010 to 2014, 24.7% moved in from 2000 to 2009, 18.5% moved in from 1990 to 1999, and 17.6% moved in 1989 or earlier. For the state as a whole, 26.6% of household owners or renters reported moving into their current residence since 2017 or later. 11.9% moved in from 2015 to 2016, 15.1% moved in from 2010 to 2014, 20.6% moved in from 2000 to 2009, 12.5% moved in from 1990 to 1999, and 13.2% moved in 1989 or earlier.

The seasonal housing problem has been made more severe as properties once available to residents or seasonal laborers have been turned into Airbnb-style short-term rentals for tourists. A 2019 documentary interviewed residents to examine and publicize this.

== Commuting patterns ==
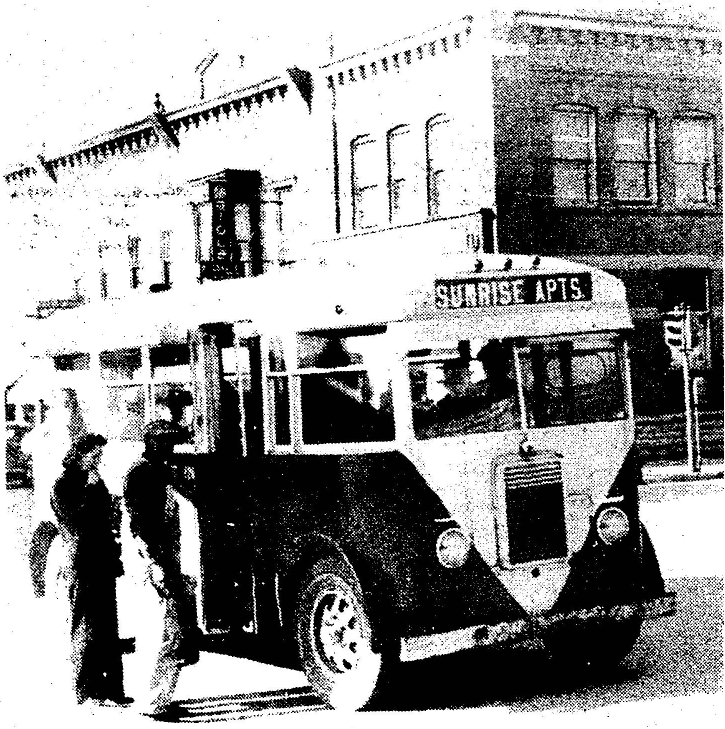
Morning commute in Sturgeon Bay, 1943

For reported labor, people in the county tend to work in the county, and jobs in the county tend to be performed by county residents. According to 2011–2015 ACS data, out of 17 counties in northeastern Wisconsin, Door County had the second lowest percentage of residents commuting out-of-county to work. Only Brown County residents were less likely to commute out of their county to work. 89.08% of reported jobs in the county are performed by workers residing within it, the highest percentage of jobs filled by in-county workers in the 17-county area. The low ranking has been attributed to the peninsula, which limits the directions people can practically commute. Within the county from 2017 ACS statistics, the communities of Sister Bay, Ephraim, Gibraltar, and the city of Sturgeon Bay have more people commuting into the community than away from it and rank within the top 25% of Wisconsin municipalities for the percent of jobs filled by outside commuters. Meanwhile, Sevastopol, Nasewaupee, Gardner, Union, and the town of Forestville all rank within the top 25% of Wisconsin municipalities for the percent of job holders residing in the community, but commuting somewhere else.

== Reliance on immigrant and foreign student labor ==
Because foreign workers brought in under the Summer Work Travel Program are sometimes housed in a different community from where they are employed, some have ended up bicycling 10–15 miles a day since they lack cars and the county has limited public transportation. Additionally, illegal or undocumented immigrants who work in the tourism industry often lack drivers' licenses. In 2012, Door County District Attorney Ray Pelrine said the "illegal immigrant workforce is now built into the structure of a lot of businesses here."

As high school enrollment in the county has dwindled, employers have turned to J-1 visas to fill seasonal positions instead. As of March 28, 2022, there were no J-1 visas issued for Washington Island, four for Ellison Bay, 32 for Sister Bay, three for Ephraim, seven each for Fish Creek and Baileys Harbor, fifty for Egg Harbor, and fifteen for Sturgeon Bay as well as pending visas issued for each of these communities. As of March 28, there was one J-1 visa being used for work in the county.

Total 9–12 enrollment at all five Door County high schools, 2000–2001 & 2004–2019

J-1 visas issued for work in Door County, 2014–2021

== Equitable and inequitable costs and benefits ==
=== Income and socio-economic status ===
In 2016, the county had the third highest per capita personal income in the state and in 2015 it had the seventh lowest poverty level in the state. In 2015, 39.0% of the population had an associate degree or more, making Door County the 12th most educated out of all 72 Wisconsin counties.

In 2017, 9.9% of the population received money from the Earned Income Tax Credit, compared to 12.1% for residents of the state as a whole.

In 1986, Dave Crehore noted that "Door County people are 'survivors,' who have put up with the worst aspects of rural and small-town life, along with generations of near-poverty." From 1969 to 2003, the county's per capita personal income kept pace with that of the state as a whole, but from 2003 to 2019, the state's per capita personal income in non-inflation adjusted dollars has only increased 65.4%, while Door County's per capita personal income jumped 101.4% to $64,249 in 2019, compared to $53,207 for the state as a whole. During most years from 1992 through 2019, taxpayers who moved into the county earned more than those who already lived there, and taxpayers who moved out of the county earned less than those remaining in the county.

Average annual adjusted gross income per tax return by migration into or out of Door County, 1992–2019
income reported on tax returns migrating into the county
income reported on tax returns remaining in the county
income reported on tax returns migrating out of the county
Notes: (Note: Most years only depict tax returns migrating inside the United States. However, the figures for 1992–1993, 2000–2001, 2002–2003, 2003–2004, 2007–2008, and 2009–2010 also include a small number of returns involving migration between the county and military zip codes or foreign countries.) (Note: The average adjusted gross income of returns migrating out of the county in 2008–2009 was heavily weighted by just 71 returns which migrated to one or more states in the South. This group of returns had an average adjusted gross income of $351,747 each. The other 556 returns migrated to other destinations in the US outside the south over the course of 2008-2009. These other returns had average adjusted gross incomes ranging from $24,286 for 14 returns migrating to Winnebago County to $66,778 for 18 returns migrating to Dane County.)

=== Geographic disparities ===
==== Resident income ====
According to 2014–2018 ACS data, four communities had median incomes lower than the county median income of $58,287. Of these, Sister Bay had the lowest median household income at $40,944, ranking the 135th lowest in the state out of 1,951 cities, villages, and towns which had available data. Following Sister Bay was the village of Forestville at $49,500 and ranking 444th lowest in a tie with New London in Waupaca County, the city of Sturgeon Bay at $52,917 and ranking 610th lowest, and Washington Island at $55,341 and ranking 737th lowest.

Gibraltar had the highest median income in the county at $80,602, the 232nd highest in the state, followed by Ephraim at $77,500 and ranking 305th highest, Egg Harbor at $75,833 and ranking 343rd highest, and Jacksonport at $70,625 at 483rd highest.

==== Local government debt ====
In 2019, the villages of Egg Harbor, Ephraim, and Sister Bay had the three highest levels of per capita municipal debt in the county, owing $45,539, $19,061, and $13,568 respectively. In contrast, the Village of Forestville and the towns of Sturgeon Bay, Sevastopol, Nasewaupee, Forestville, and Egg Harbor had no debt at all. Aside from these six communities without debt, the three indebted local governments with the lowest per capita levels of debt in the county were the County of Door and the towns of Brussels and Clay Banks, which respectively owed $479, $422, and $45 per capita. The villages of Egg Harbor, Ephraim, and Sister Bay respectively had the highest, second-highest and fourth-highest per capita debt of all 1,921 Wisconsin local governments in 2019. The Town of Gibraltar ranked as the sixth-highest in the state with $8,917 of per capita debt.

In September 2021, the village of Sister Bay approved a plan to take on an additional $6.3 million in debt in 2023 and 2024 to fund the construction of a new village administration building, a new post office, and to improve the ice skating rink.

=== Mortgage lending ===
The estimated percentage of people in the county with a bad credit score decreased from a peak of 18.1% in January 2010 to 9.0% in April 2021.

In 2017 Home Mortgage Disclosure Act figures, out of 1,593 mortgage loan applications in Door County, 1,111 were approved and sent through the origination process. 71 additional loan applications were also approved, but for some other reason the loans were ultimately not taken out. 227 applications were denied, 146 were withdrawn, and 38 resulted in other actions. Of the 1,111 loans originated in 2017, 615 were for purchasing a home, 82 financed home improvements, and 414 were for refinancing. Out of the 1,111 loans originated in 2017, 1,073 were for single family dwellings and 38 were for manufactured homes. The median amount loaned was $149,000, and the median applicant or applicant household earned $70,000 annually. 37 loans required between 1.5% to 3.5% additional interest for a subprime loan. This amounted to 3.3% of the total 1,111 loans and is less than the 6.7% of subprime loans originated in the United States as whole in 2017. For the 227 denied loan applications, 65 were due to the applicant already owing too much debt. Another 62 were denied because the applicant lacked adequate collateral. 14 applications were denied because they didn't have enough money for the down payment and closing costs. Another 14 were denied because the loan application was incomplete. 4 did not have a good enough employment history to qualify for the loan, four did not verify their information, and 8 loan applications were denied for other reasons.

=== Income inequality and housing ===
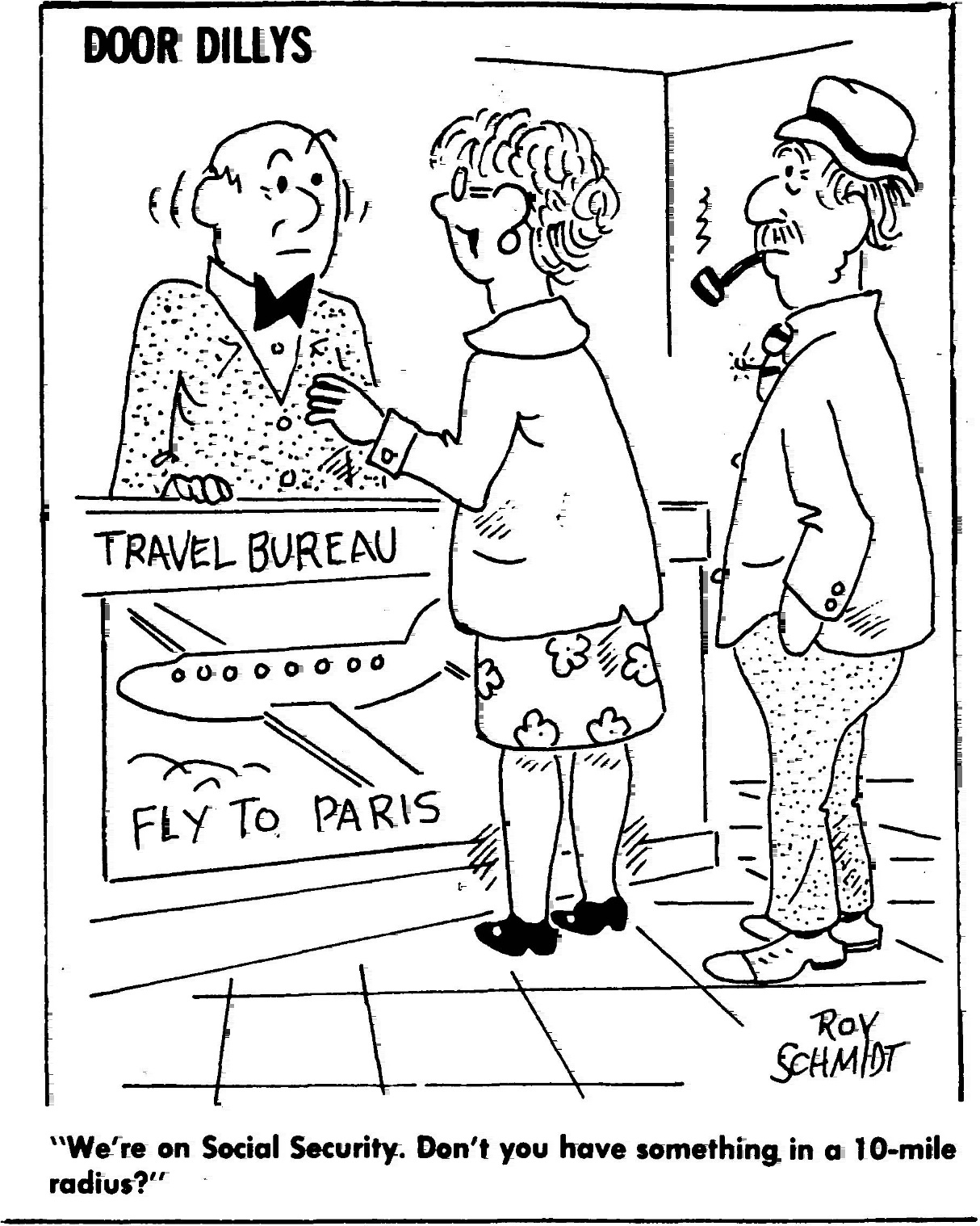
A comic drawn for the Door County Advocate in 1977 depicting elderly county residents with limited income

In 2019 income percentiles for Wisconsin taxable income (excluding dependents), county residents were less likely to be in the top 5% and 80%–95% income percentiles than residents of the state as a whole, and were more likely to be in the 0%–20% and 20%–40% income percentiles than residents of the state as a whole.

Estimates for the Gini coefficient document an overall increase in the degree of income inequality in the county from 1990 to 2015–2019. Larger coefficient values indicate more income inequality. Gini coefficient estimates for the county were 0.3995 in 1990, 0.4226 in 2000, 0.411 for the 2006–2010 ACS five-year estimate and 0.4390 for the 2015–2019 ACS five-year estimate. Due to the margins of error for the estimates, some of the intermediate fluctuations between 1990 and 2015-2019 may be due to chance rather than reflect actual trends.

Comparisons of income inequality between Door and other counties nationally show mixed results. Using the ACS five-year estimates from 2012 to 2016, the household income ratio between the 80th to 20th percentiles was only 3.76, the 352nd lowest such ratio out of 3,140 U.S. counties. On the other hand, 23.1% of all household income in the county was earned by the top 5th percentile, the 452nd greatest percentage out of 3,135 U.S. counties reporting data.

A 2019 report by the Wisconsin Bureau of Aging and Disability Resources based on data from 2013 to 2017 found that while only 12.7% of Door County residents aged 65 and older rented (compared to 23.5% statewide), 59.8% of those who did rent spent 30% or more of their income on rental costs (compared to 55.4% statewide). In 2018 Internal Revenue statistics, income tax returns showed Door County's elderly to have a higher degree of income inequality when compared to elderly in the state as a whole and also when compared to county income tax returns for all ages. 3.51% of returns by elderly Door County residents indicated an income of less than $1, compared to 2.30% of returns filed by elderly in the state as a whole, and also compared to 2.17% of returns filed by Door County residents of all ages. In contrast, 25.4% of returns filed by Door County's elderly indicated an income of $100,000 or greater, compared to 20.6% of returns filed by elderly in the state as a whole, and also compared to 18.6% of returns filed by Door County residents of all ages.

Most of the homeless in Door County are couch surfers, although in the summer many will camp or live out of their vehicles. Out of 45 children or adults recently reaching the age of majority discharged from the foster care system in the county between 2005 and 2013, two became homeless and none were homeless during their last placement setting.

The largest single-family house in the state is in Liberty Grove. It was built in 1996 and is about 35,000 square feet. Although in 2005 it sold for about $20 million, in 2016 it sold for only $2.7 million, and in 2019 was assessed at $2.6 million. Additionally, an earth house in Sevastopol has been considered the "strangest home in Wisconsin."

== Patents ==
From 2000 to 2015, 61 patents have been issued to inventors with Door County being the residence of the first inventor listed. From 1976–August 2021, 154 patents were issued to inventors and plant breeders residing in Sturgeon Bay.

== See also ==
- List of Wisconsin locations by per capita income
- Wisconsin § Economy
- Economy of Illinois
- Economy of Chicago
- Great Lakes § Economy
- Resort town § Resort town economy
