= Economy of Illinois =

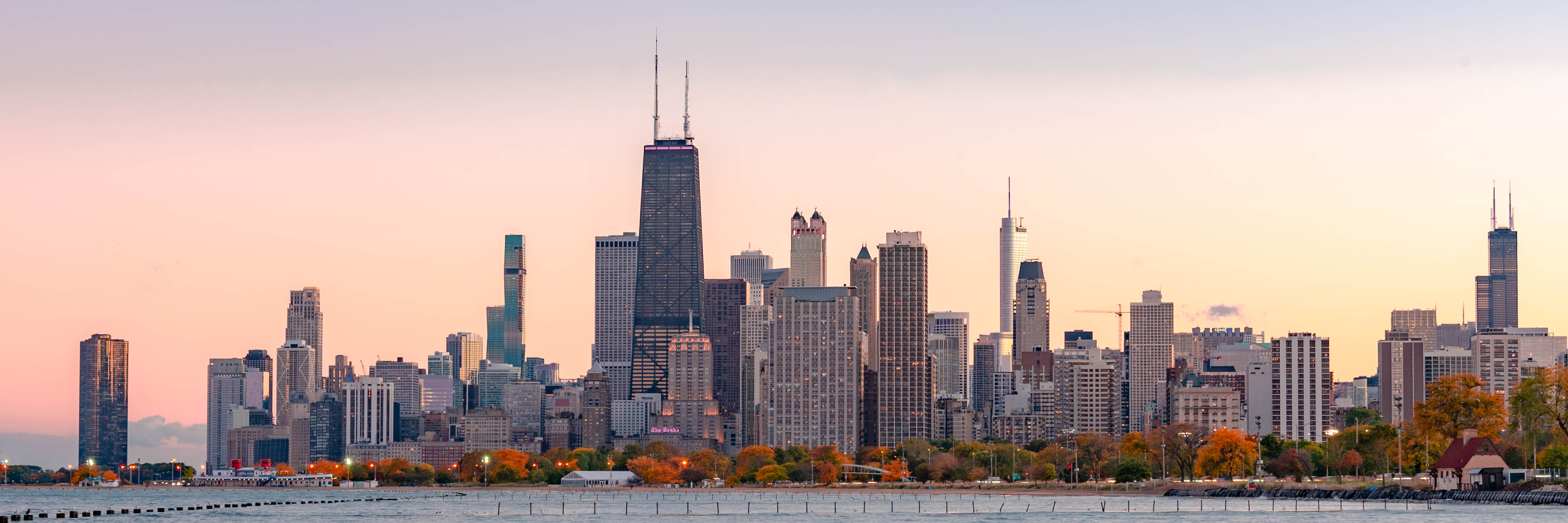
- Chicago, the largest city in Illinois

Statistics
- GDP: $1.240 trillion (2025)
- GDP per capita: $97,568 (2025)
- Gini coefficient: 0.469
- Labor force: 6,563,000 (March 2026)
- Unemployment: 4.7% (Aug. 2026)

Public finance
- Revenue: $53.9 billion (FY2025, General Funds actual)
- Spending: $53.9 billion (FY2025, General Funds actual)

The economy of Illinois is the fifth largest by GDP in the United States and one of the most diversified economies in the world. Fueled by the economy of Chicago, the Chicago metropolitan area is home to many of the United States’ largest companies, including Abbott Laboratories, AbbVie Inc., Allstate, Archer Daniels Midland, Baxter International, CDW, Conagra, Crate & Barrel, Exelon, Kraft Heinz, McDonald’s, CNH Industrial, GE Healthcare, Aon PLC, JLL, Willis Towers Watson, Mondelez International, Motorola, United Airlines, US Foods, Walgreens, and more.

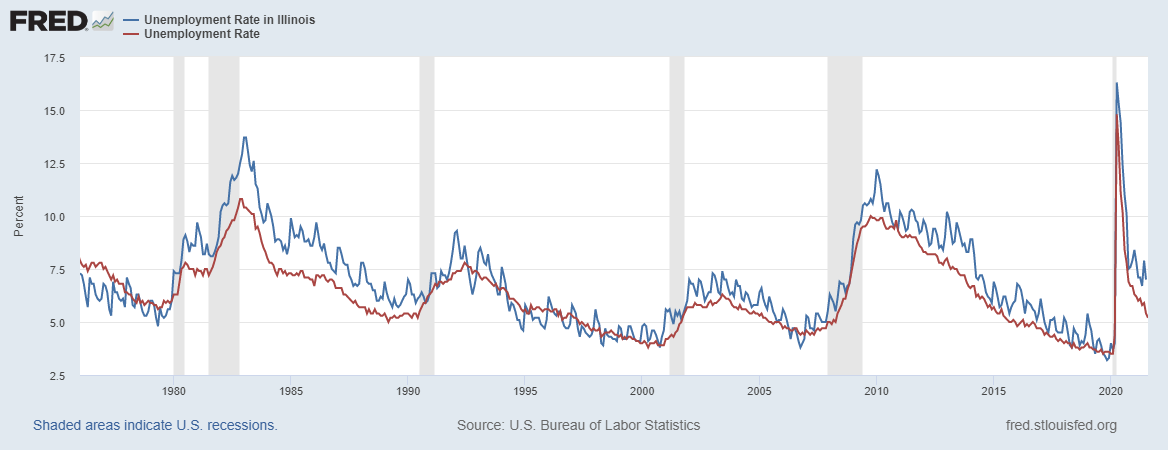
Illinois unemployment rate, 1976–2021 US unemployment rate

The Chicago area is a global financial center and is headquarters to financial institutions including BMO Bank, Cboe Global Markets, Chicago Board of Trade, Citadel LLC, CME Group, CNA Financial, Discover Financial, Morningstar, Inc., Nuveen, and TransUnion. Chicago is also home to the largest futures exchange in the world, the Chicago Mercantile Exchange.

Across the state, other Fortune 500 world headquarters based in Illinois include State Farm in Bloomington and John Deere in Moline. As of the 2025/2026 Fortune 500 list, Illinois ranked among the top five states for the most Fortune 500 companies headquartered in the state, with a total of 32. Chicago alone hosts 14 of these headquarters. For multiple consecutive years through the mid-2020s, Chicagoland ranked among the nation’s top metropolitan areas for corporate relocations, though specific multi-year streaks vary by source and methodology.

The 2025 total gross state product for Illinois was $1.240 trillion, placing it fifth in the nation (behind California, Texas, New York, and Florida). This represents growth from $1.148 trillion in 2024 (nominal terms), with real GDP expanding at rates competitive with or exceeding the national average in late 2025 quarters per BEA data. The 2020–2024 median household income (in 2024 dollars) stood at $83,390, among the nation’s higher figures. In recent years, the nine counties of the Chicago metropolitan area have continued to account for the large majority (approximately 75–80%) of the state’s total wages, with the remaining 93 counties contributing the balance. This highlights the pervasive geographic concentration even as downstate manufacturing, agriculture, and logistics add their own value.

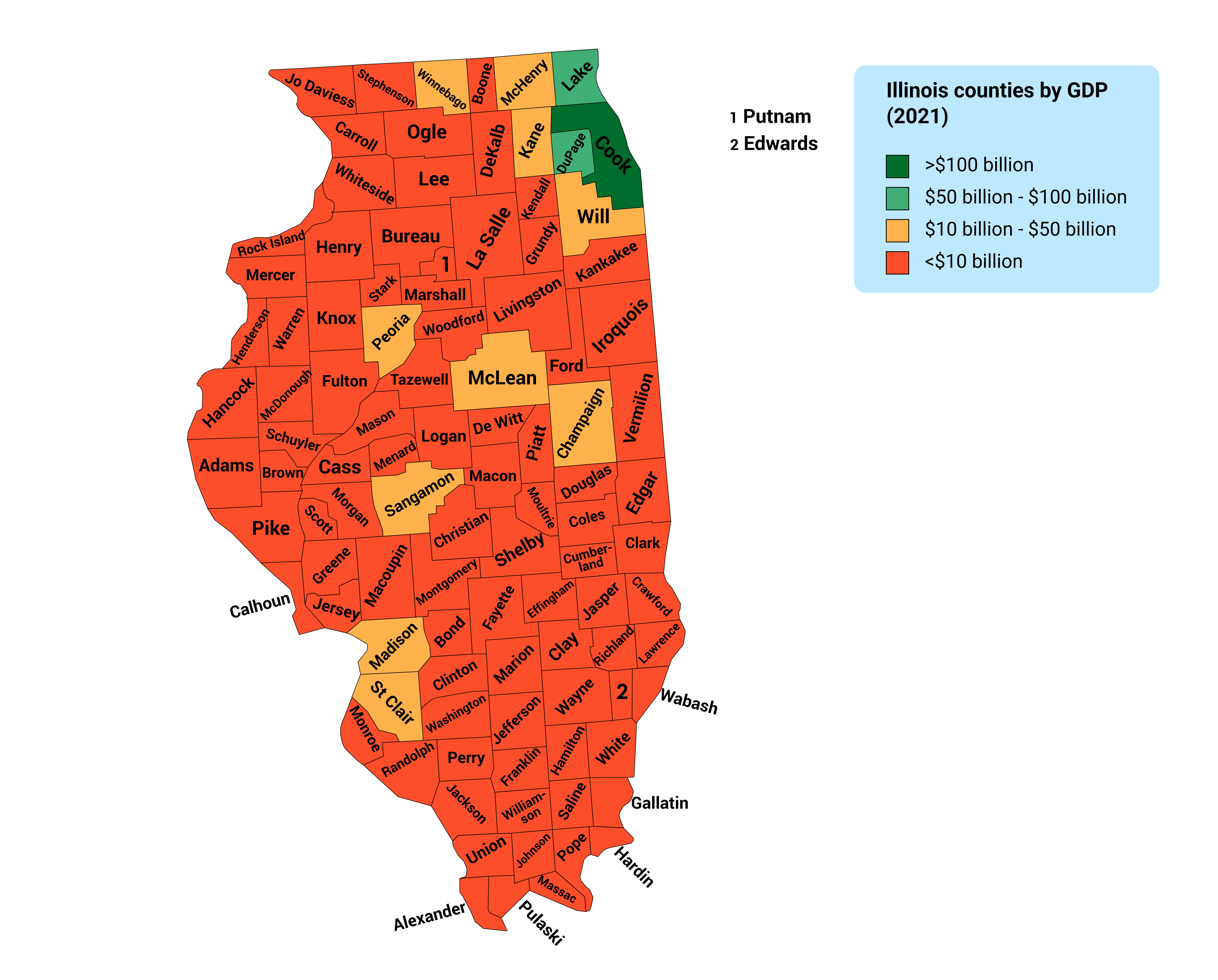
Illinois counties by GDP in 2021 (chained 2012 US$)

The state’s industrial outputs include machinery, food processing, electrical equipment, chemical products, publishing, fabricated metal products, and transportation equipment. Corn and soybeans remain important agricultural products. Service industries of note are financial trading, higher education, logistics, and medicine.

== Agriculture ==
Most of the state of Illinois lies outside the Chicago metropolitan area and inside the North American Corn Belt. Corn, soybeans, and other large-field crops are grown extensively. These crops and their products account for much of the state's economic output outside Chicago. Much of the field crop is remanufactured into feed for hogs and cattle. Dairy products and wheat are important secondary crops in specific segments of the state.

In addition, some Illinois farmers grow specialty crops such as popcorn and pumpkins. The state is the largest producer of pumpkins among the U.S. states. There is a large watermelon growing area centered on Lincoln, Illinois. Illinois wine is a growing industry. In December 2006, the Shawnee Hills were named Illinois's first American Viticultural Area (AVA).

The Illinois Farm Bureau and FS Growmark both have their headquarters in Bloomington.

== Manufacturing ==
Manufacturing in Illinois accounts for 14% of the state's total output and generates $101 billion in economic activity. Illinois's manufacturing sector grew out of its agricultural production. A key piece of infrastructure for several generations was the Union Stock Yards of Chicago, which from 1865 until 1971 penned and slaughtered millions of cattle and hogs into standardized cuts of beef and pork.

In 1893 Illinois manufacturers formed the Illinois Manufacturers' Association in opposition to the Sweatshop Law of 1893 that prohibited child labor and mandated an eight-hour workday. Governor Peter Altgeld had made Florence Kelley the Chief Factory Inspector for the state of Illinois. The association sponsored a number of cases which led to the Illinois Supreme Court finding that Section 5 of the Act unconstitutional in 1895.

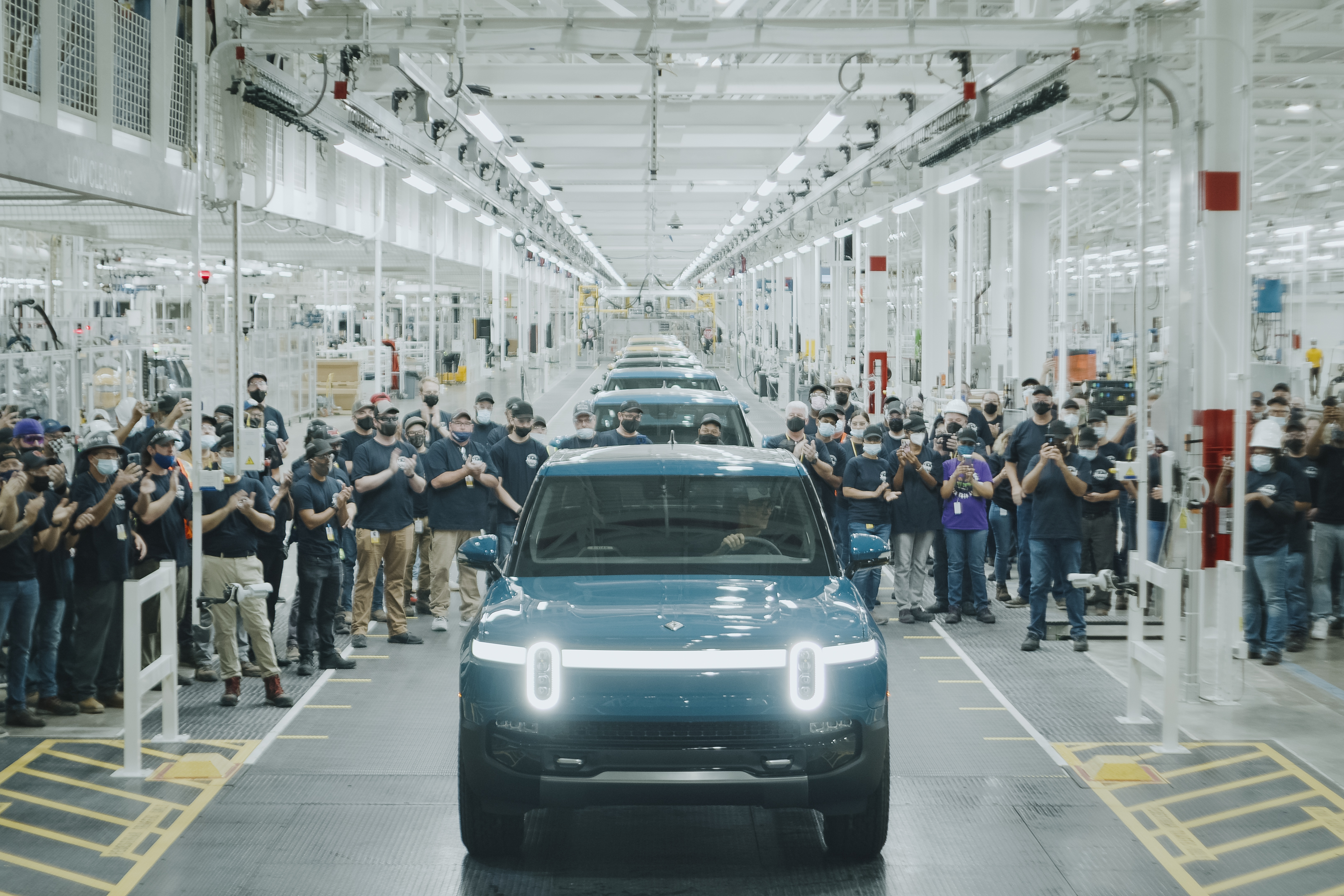
Rivian plant in Normal

The centralized location of Illinois made it a key manufacturing hub, especially for farm machinery and specialty motor vehicles. Smaller cities like Aurora, Peoria, Decatur, Rockford and other cities became major manufacturing centers in the 20th century. In downstate Illinois, the John Deere Company in Moline became one of the world's largest makers of farm machinery, and Caterpillar achieved similar dominance in its diversified line of off-road vehicles with its facilities in the Peoria area. Since the late 2010s and early 2020s, Rivian Automotive has built and expanded its main manufacturing plant in Normal.

The Chicago area, meanwhile, began to produce significant quantities of telecommunications gear, electronics, steel, automobiles, and industrial products.

As of 2004, the leading manufacturing industries in Illinois, based upon value-added, were chemical manufacturing ($16.6 billion), food manufacturing ($14.4 billion), machinery manufacturing ($13.6 billion), fabricated metal products ($10.5 billion), plastics and rubber products ($6.8 billion), transportation equipment ($6.7 billion), and computer and electronic products ($6.4 billion).

== Renewable energy ==
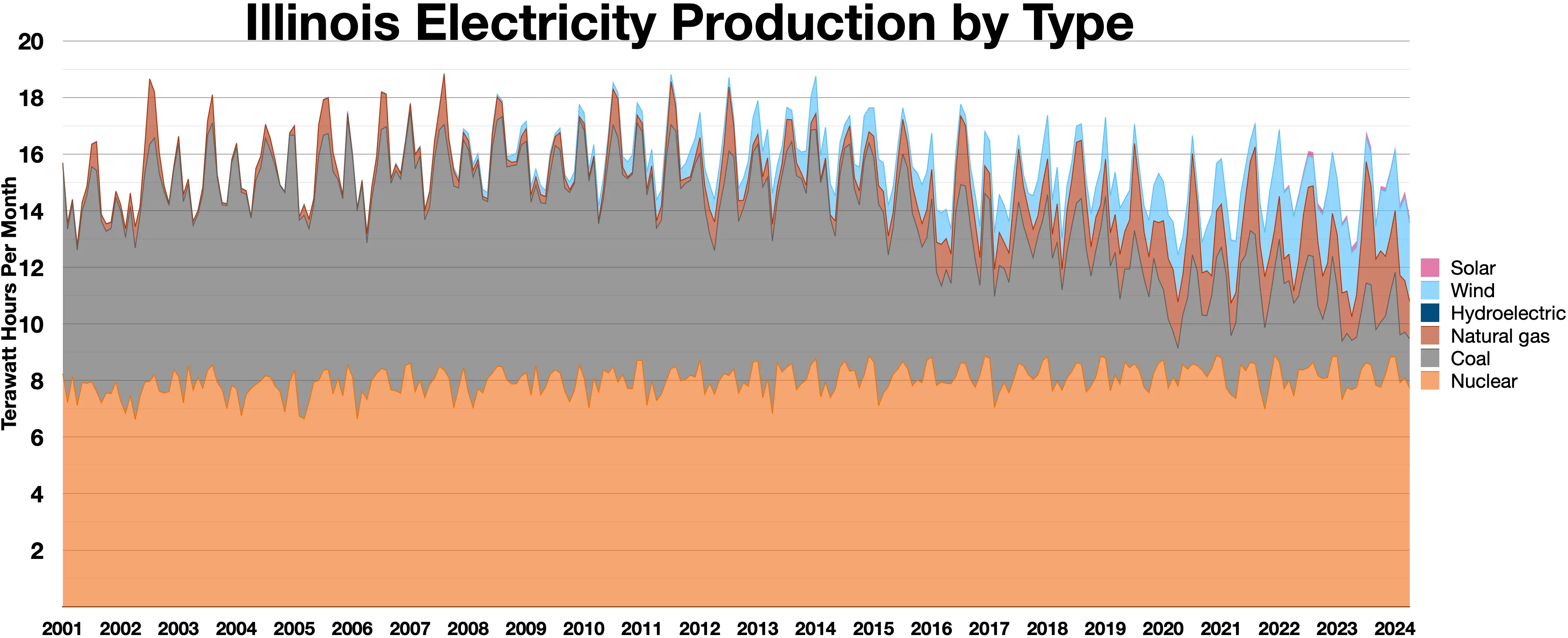
Illinois electricity production by type

Illinois currently ranks second in the Midwest for total installed renewable power capacity and fifth nationally for installed wind power capacity. The renewable energy economy has created 114,000 jobs in Illinois and will continue to see growth after a $15 billion investment from the Future Energy Jobs Act in 2016.

Governor J. B. Pritzker committed Illinois to the U.S. Climate Alliance in 2019 which will further drive economic growth in renewable energy across the state.

== Services ==
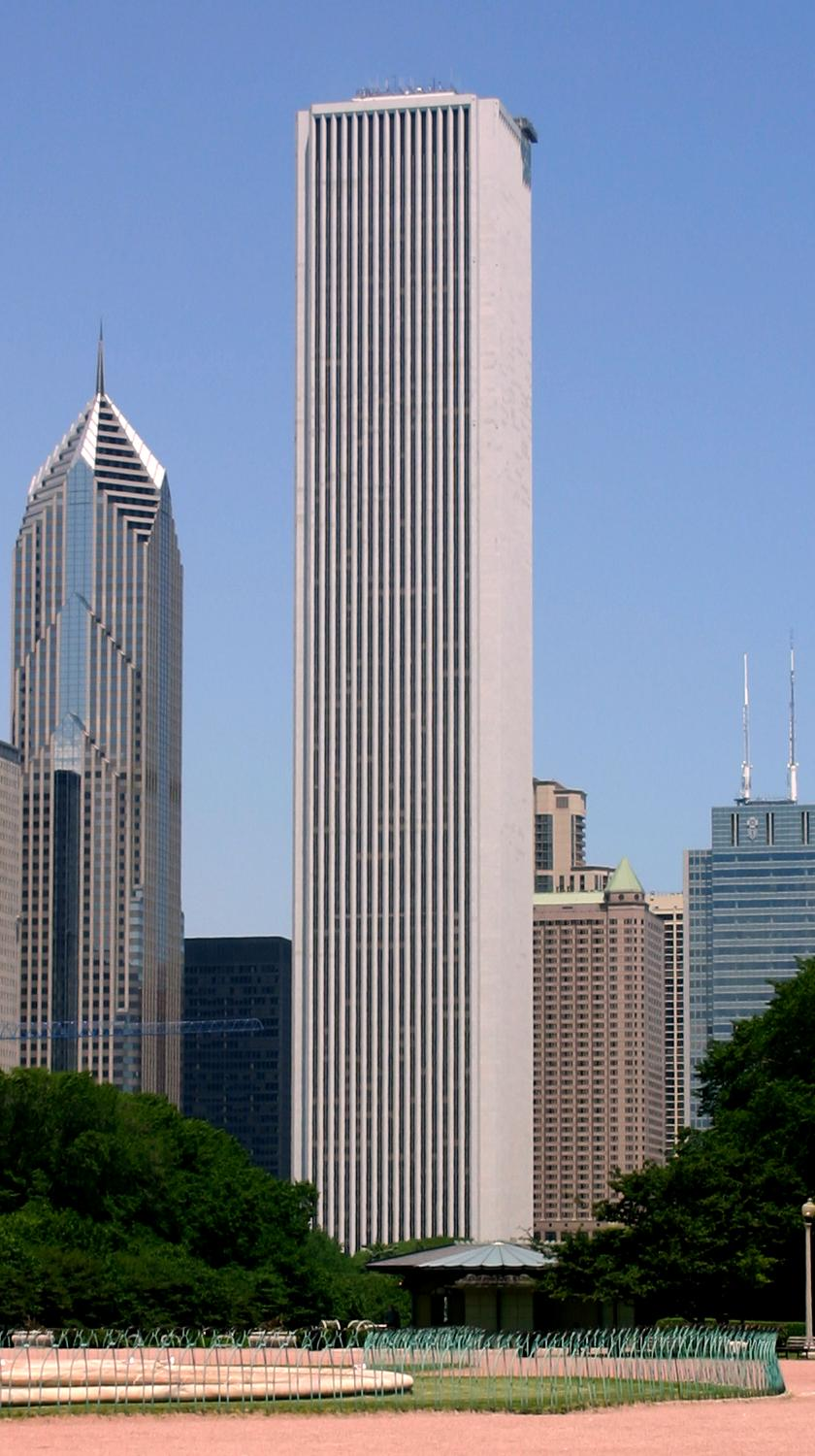
Aon Center

By the early 2000s, Illinois's economy had moved toward a dependence on high-value-added services such as financial trading, higher education, logistics, and medicine. In some cases, these services clustered around institutions that hearkened back to Illinois's earlier economies.

In the late 2010s, the Chicago Metropolitan Area continued to lead the nation in luring corporate relocations or expanded corporate facilities.

== Tourism ==
In 2018, Illinois set a new tourism record with 117 million tourists which represented a 3 million person increase from the previous year. Visitors spent nearly $42 billion in spending the same year.

== Flash index ==
The Institute of Government and Public Affairs at the University of Illinois at Urbana–Champaign publishes a "flash-index" that aims to measure expected economic growth in Illinois. The indicators used are corporate earnings, consumer spending and personal income. These indicators are measured through tax receipts, adjusted for inflation. 100 is the base, so a number above 100 represents growth in the Illinois economy, and a number below 100 represents a shrinking economy. Data from the index, from 6/1981 to the present, can be found here.

== See also ==
- Economy of Chicago
- Great Lakes Megalopolis
