= Economy of Chicago =

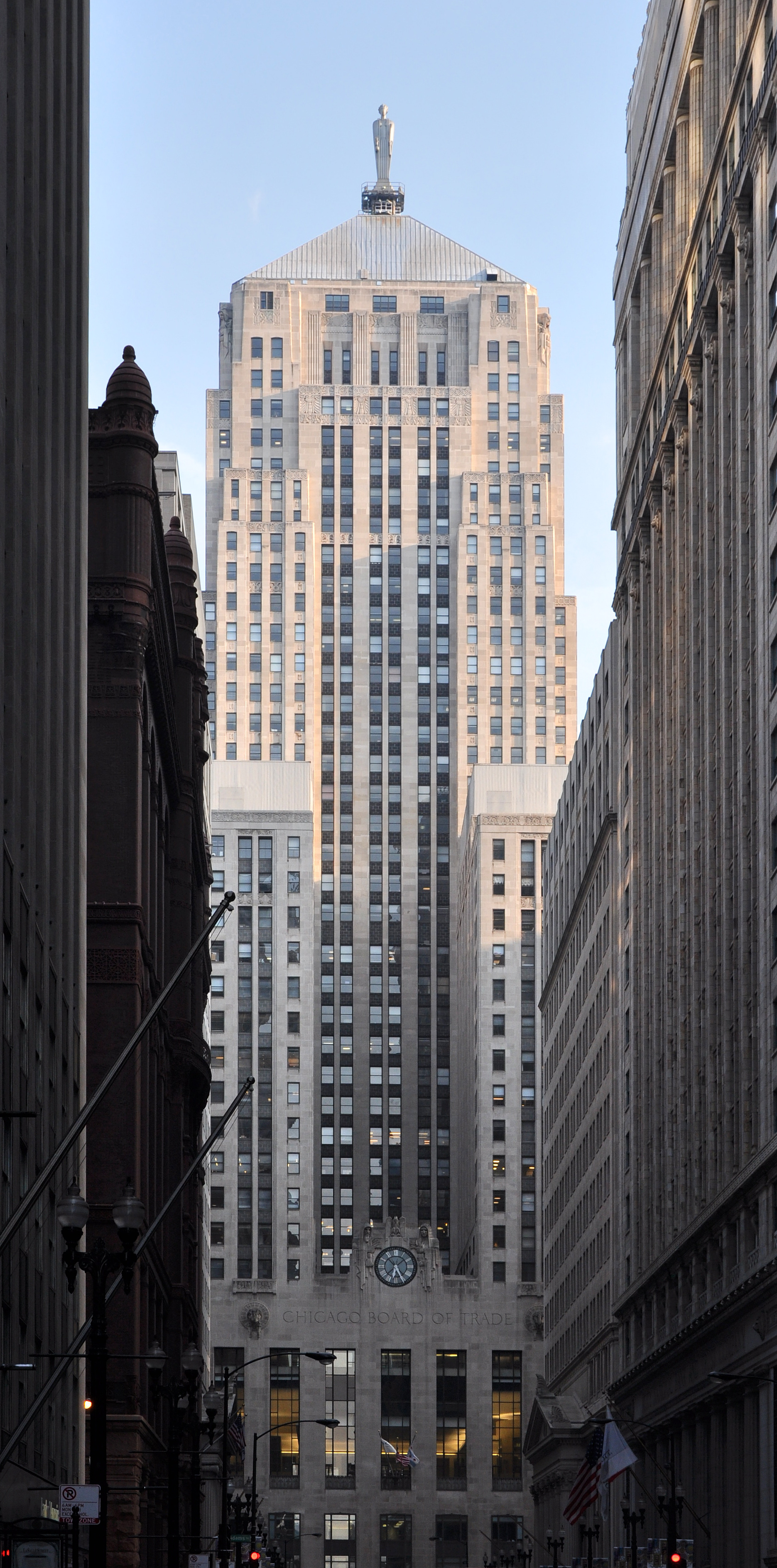
Chicago Board of Trade

Chicago and its suburbs is home to 35 Fortune 500 companies and is a transportation and distribution center. Manufacturing, printing, publishing, insurance, transportation, financial trading and services, and food processing also play major roles in the city's economy. The total economic output of Chicago in gross metropolitan product totaled US$770.7 billion in 2020, surpassing the total economic output of Switzerland and making Chicago's gross metropolitan product (GMP) the third largest in the United States. The city is home to several Fortune 500 companies, including Archer Daniels Midland, Conagra Brands, Exelon, JLL, Kraft Heinz, McDonald's, Mondelez International, Motorola Solutions, Sears, and United Airlines Holdings, although Chicago has experienced an exodus of large corporations since 2020, including Boeing; Citadel LLC; Caterpillar; and Tyson Foods. Three Fortune 500 companies left Chicago in 2022, leaving the city with 35, still second to New York City.

== Real estate and corporate location ==
The Lakeshore East development and the 300 North Lasalle office building are projects completed after 2000. Since the Great Recession, other projects, such as the planned 150-story, 2000 foot Chicago Spire by architect Santiago Calatrava, have been canceled. Many city neighborhoods are gentrifying at a rapid pace as well, including Humboldt Park, Logan Square, Lincoln Park, and Wicker Park. The massive expansion of O'Hare International Airport and recently reconstructed Dan Ryan Expressway will shape development patterns for years to come.

Changes in house prices for the Chicago metropolitan area are publicly tracked on a regular basis using the Case–Shiller index; the statistic is published by Standard & Poor's and is also a component of S&P's 10-city composite index of the value of the residential real estate market.

== Finance ==
The city houses one of the Federal Reserve Banks, established in 1914. There is also the Federal Home Loan Bank of Chicago. The largest banks in the Chicago region (by % of deposits) are: JPMorgan Chase, Bank of America (through its acquisition of LaSalle Bank), BMO Harris Bank (a BMO subsidiary), and Northern Trust. The largest banks headquartered in Chicago are: BMO Harris Bank, Northern Trust, Wintrust Financial, and First Midwest Bank. Many financial institutions are in the Loop.

Chicago has five major financial exchanges, including the Chicago Stock Exchange (CHX), the Chicago Board Options Exchange (CBOE), the Chicago Mercantile Exchange (CME), the Chicago Board of Trade (CBOT), and NYSE Arca. While the city of Chicago houses most of the major brokerage firms in the area, some insurance companies are in the suburbs, such as Allstate Corporation.

In the 2020 Global Financial Centres Index, Chicago was ranked as having the 20th most competitive financial center in the world and sixth-most competitive in the United States (after New York City, San Francisco, Los Angeles, Boston, and Washington, D.C.).

== Largest employers ==
According to Reboot Illinois, the largest employers in the city of Chicago are:

#	Employer	Employees
1	U.S. Government	49,400
2	Chicago Public Schools	39,094
3	City of Chicago	30,340
4	Cook County, Illinois	21,482
5	Advocate Health System	18,512
6	JPMorgan Chase	16,045
7	University of Chicago	15,452
8	State of Illinois	14,731
9	United Continental Holdings	14,000
10	AT&T Illinois	14,000
11	Walgreens	13,657
12	Abbott Laboratories	12,000
13	Presence Health	11,959
14	Chicago Transit Authority	11,100
15	University of Illinois at Chicago	9,900
16	Northwestern Memorial Healthcare	9,614
17	American Airlines	9,600
18	Jewel-Osco	9,155
19	Northwestern University	9,121
20	Allstate	7,808
21	Aon	7,667
22	Rush University Medical Center	7,500
23	Archdiocese of Chicago	7,500
24	Walmart	7,260
25	Northern Trust Company	6,644

== Historic highlights ==
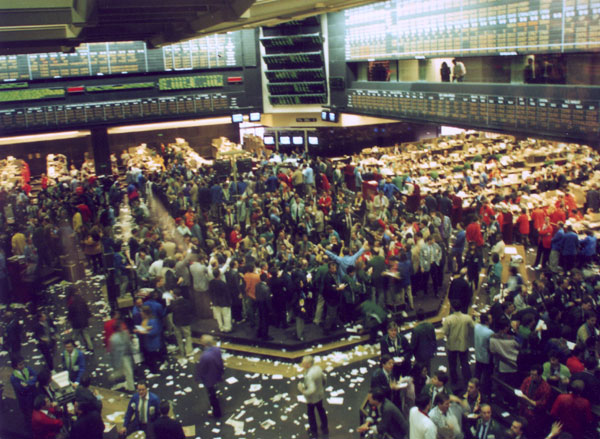
Chicago Board of Trade

Before it was incorporated as a town in 1833, the primary industry was fur trading. In the 1790s, Jean Baptiste Pointe du Sable, the area's first resident and Haitian-born fur trader, established a fur trading post in the area, which later became known as Fort Dearborn, along the bank of the Chicago River, where he traded until relocating again in 1800.

The American Fur Company, established in 1808 by John Jacob Astor to compete with the powerful Canadian North West and Hudson Bay companies, practically took control of the fur trade in the United States following the War of 1812. It quickly became known for its ruthless practice of buying out or destroying the competition, as most private traders in Chicago soon found out. It appointed John Kinzie and Antoine Deschamps as its first agents in northern Illinois, and they reported to the company's headquarters on Mackinac Island. Their field of operations covered northeastern Illinois and the Illinois River. In 1819, Charles H. Beaubien was brought in to assist Kinzie and eventually became head of the outfit. Gurdon S. Hubbard replaced Deschamps in 1823 but soon went on his own by purchasing all interests of the company in Illinois.

== Industrialization ==
Late in the 19th century, Chicago was part of the bicycle craze, as home to Western Wheel Company, which introduced stamping to the production process and significantly reduced costs, while early in the 20th century, the city was part of the automobile revolution, hosting the brass era car builder Bugmobile, which was founded there in 1907.

It was also home to Grigsby-Grunow, which manufactured radios under the Majestic brand until the company failed in 1934. (Majestic Radio and Television Corporation preserved the Majestic name, while General Household Utilities kept Grunow alive.) Chicago also hosted E. H. Scott's Scott Transformer Company, which introduced a high-grade radio in 1928, and grew into Scott Radio Laboratories; this was located at 4450 Ravenswood Avenue in 1946, and produced "very expensive, beautifully-designed, chrome-plated chassis". It added "a line of high-quality television sets in 1949". Other entrants in this business were Zenith, which started life there in 1918, entering auto radios in the 1930s, and Galvin Manufacturing Corporation, which started manufacturing power supplies in 1928 and went on to automobile radios under the Motorola marque in 1930, as well as Walkie-talkie and Handie-Talkie and for the Army.

During World War II, the steel mills in the city of Chicago alone accounted for 20% of all steel production in the United States and 10% of global production. The city produced more steel than the United Kingdom during the war, and surpassed Nazi Germany's output in 1943 (after barely missing in 1942). Some mills were located on the branches of the Chicago River emanating from the downtown area, but the largest mills were located along the Calumet River and Lake Calumet in the far south of the city. Over 200,000 people were employed in the steel industry at its peak in the 1950s and 1960s, but mass layoffs in the 1970s and 1980s devastated many working class south side neighborhoods that were heavily dependent on industrial jobs. Downsizing and plant closures continued into the 1990s and 2000s, and the US Dept of Commerce estimates that today fewer than 25,000 people are employed in the steel industry in the Chicago–Joliet–Naperville, IL–IN–WI Metropolitan Statistical Area (18,000 of whom are actually in Northwest Indiana.

In 1945, US Steel was Chicago's largest single employer, with 18,000 workers at the company's South Works.

Massive amounts of goods passed through Chicago from places in the Mississippi Valley such as St. Louis, Missouri. Grain was stored in Chicago, and people began buying contracts on it. Later, people as far away as New York City began buying contracts by telegraph on the goods that would be stored in Chicago in the future. From this were established the Chicago Board of Trade (CBOT) and the Chicago Mercantile Exchange (CME).

== Notable people ==
Chicago has produced many of the foremost industrialists, corporate lawyers, merchants, and financiers in United States history. Among the foremost of the Chicago industrialists, lawyers, financiers, and merchants were John Villiers Farwell, Edmund Dick Taylor, Potter Palmer, George Pullman, Charles Gray, Marshall Field, Richard Teller Crane, Martin Ryerson, John Jacob Glessner, Jacob Bunn, John Whitfield Bunn, John Graves Shedd, Cyrus Hall McCormick, Edward Avery Shedd, Charles Banks Shedd, Leander McCormick, Stanley Field, Charles Deering, James Deering, Robert Law, Francis Peabody, Leonard Richardson, Milo Barnum Richardson, Joseph Edward Otis, Frank Hatch Jones, Arthur Jerome Eddy, Arthur J. Caton, Nathaniel Kellogg Fairbank, Ezra Butler McCagg, Julius Rosenwald, Morris Selz, Harry Selz, William McCormick Blair, William Douglas Richardson, Charles Farwell, James Monroe Stryker and Jon Stryker of the Bunn–Richardson–Stryker–Taylor family (See: John Whitfield Bunn and Jacob Bunn), Samuel Insull, Max Adler, Lucius Fisher, Lucius Teeter, John Peter Altgeld, Walter Gurnee, Philip Danforth Armour, Gustavus Franklin Swift, Michael Morris, Jacob Best, Jonathan Y. Scammon, and many others.

== See also ==
- Tourism in Chicago
- List of companies in the Chicago metropolitan area
- Economy of Illinois
- Great Lakes Megalopolis
