= List of countries by historical government spending =

This article lists countries alphabetically, with total government expenditure as percentage of gross domestic product (GDP) for the listed countries. Also stated is the government revenue and net lending/borrowing of the government as percentage of GDP. All data is based on the World Economic Outlook Databook of the International Monetary Fund.

== Historical development ==
Development of government spending as percentage of GDP of different countries.

=== 1940–2020 ===
Country	2020	2010	2000	1990	1980	1970	1960	1950	1940
Algeria	37.98	36.89	28.57	25.71					
Argentina	41.64	38.76	28.21	10.99	15.17	12.05	11.30	11.20	8.80
Australia	44.98	37.16	35.63	36.10	33.21	25.32	21.83	12.22	7.07
Austria	57.90	52.53	51.94	51.51	50.01	39.54	36.29	36.36	
Bangladesh	15.03	14.59	13.24	12.50	15.03				
Belgium	60.80	52.94	49.08	52.31	54.89	42.66	23.75	22.85	
Brazil	42.73	40.40	35.29		6.80	11.40	13.71	8.70	10.81
Canada	52.45	43.82	41.11	48.80	41.55	36.03	14.93	14.99	18.61
Chile	28.97	25.15	23.87	18.95	23.84	21.09	19.73	14.93	12.43
China	36.98	22.67	17.05	20.98					
Colombia	33.44	27.47	26.41	9.40	9.60	10.00	6.70	5.60	6.10
Denmark	55.08	58.47	53.67	55.41	52.66	24.39	16.42	10.05	12.19
Ethiopia	14.47	18.63	25.78	20.40	13.20				
Finland	56.72	55.11	48.26	48.15	40.15	21.85	22.47	23.88	48.95
France	62.40	56.63	51.69	49.58	45.96	20.50	22.18	24.12	
Germany	51.09	47.87	45.10	44.73	48.23	39.46	22.94	27.17	
Ghana	28.28	24.11	20.10	11.85	11.19	12.17			
Greece	58.19	50.24	47.12	45.21	27.66	25.17	19.95	27.09	
India	30.98	27.32	26.99	27.23	17.48	11.72	11.23	5.31	5.33
Indonesia	18.23	18.27	16.64	15.84	22.09	13.80	14.42		
Iran	17.95	21.75	18.04	21.95	35.76				
Ireland	28.71	65.05	31.18	42.81	53.71	44.13	29.14	25.90	19.52
Israel	46.40	45.43	51.40	46.79	69.40	41.55	30.38	18.79	
Italy	57.25	50.28	45.86	52.86	40.79	32.32	16.49	17.28	38.11
Japan	46.67	39.83	37.28	30.05	33.45	20.25	18.35	15.86	3.99
Kenya	25.70	30.14	20.53	22.94					
South Korea	25.63	21.21	17.95	15.15	16.77	17.50	17.88		
Malaysia	25.41	26.28	27.92	36.13					
Mexico	29.12	26.28	21.11	16.57	17.54	10.94	9.50	8.78	7.39
Morocco	36.31	31.91	25.85	28.57					
Netherlands	46.90	51.19	44.17	54.91	55.20	43.20	20.39	23.97	
Norway	58.15	45.92	42.30	53.31	46.13	38.91	17.97	18.05	
Pakistan	23.12	20.26	18.59	23.92	21.98	23.56	10.00	5.55	
Peru	26.38	20.40	20.53	20.36	19.32	14.35	13.33	11.33	6.65
Philippines	25.11	16.88	18.67	18.00	13.42	10.45	10.08	7.23	
Poland	48.95	45.37	41.08			25.83	39.20	21.64	
Portugal	48.12	51.35	41.13	38.50	32.36	15.52	14.25	9.81	10.31
Romania	38.81	40.90	38.56		33.63	28.15			
Russia	38.78	38.50	32.84					6.11	5.49
South Africa	40.11	32.99	25.86	28.70	21.84	20.05	16.65	19.25	28.31
Spain	52.26	45.62	39.19	32.75	16.34	12.25	11.02	11.67	19.65
Sweden	53.06	52.89	55.09	37.96	41.02	29.51	24.43	18.28	22.73
Switzerland	36.26	34.17	35.10	30.30	29.93	25.75	7.11	8.58	18.14
Taiwan	19.04	22.13	25.60	28.69	24.84				
Thailand	25.31	23.03	19.06	16.56	18.73	17.57	12.07	9.06	
Turkey	34.63	35.55	37.71	14.07	25.46	22.69	15.57	15.15	
United Kingdom	50.27	50.56	36.76	41.11	47.63	42.00	33.14	33.15	28.38
United States	46.18	42.46	33.88	37.20	34.29	32.30	28.29	13.44	8.94
Venezuela	10.93	36.95	28.29	31.93	21.97	19.48	23.67	16.00	14.17

=== 1850–1930 ===
Country	1930	1920	1910	1900	1890	1880	1870	1860	1850
Argentina	9.40	4.62	8.92	8.25	7.73	8.04	8.56		
Australia	5.47	7.69	2.66						
Austria	19.80		17.33	15.59	13.45	11.36			
Belgium	19.09		10.78	9.90	8.74	6.18	4.80	5.04	
Brazil	11.21	12.52	13.00	15.50	25.70	24.19			
Canada	7.72	10.45	6.01	6.12	5.68	6.76	4.94		
Chile	13.89	8.76	12.81	11.63	14.21	8.42	8.02	5.52	5.63
Colombia	4.90	4.40	5.90						
Denmark	6.90	7.21	6.45	5.96	6.87	8.82			
Finland	19.75	15.26	11.73	6.80	6.17				
France	18.65		10.56	11.42	11.36	13.24	13.24		
Germany	16.34		19.47	17.85	16.32	10.31			
Greece	26.00		19.65	19.75	25.70	23.55			
India	5.54	6.43	5.96	7.18	6.87	7.34	6.26		
Italy	14.16	18.79	13.89	12.58	14.35	11.10	9.85		
Japan	2.89	1.93	3.12	1.01	0.78	0.86			
Mexico	5.98	4.11	3.65	4.71					
Netherlands	8.69		10.24	10.99	13.93	9.60			
Norway	8.59	8.64	8.61	9.90	6.83				
Peru	7.04	4.47	4.39	3.59					
Portugal	7.87	12.12	7.55	6.98	8.03	6.74			
Russia	12.65			23.82	15.63	13.09			
South Africa	18.77	18.53							
Spain	10.55	12.12	9.95	8.52	9.24	8.68	15.29	10.67	7.46
Sweden	8.73	7.63	8.48	7.23	6.84	6.77	5.96	6.52	5.09
Switzerland	4.29		4.15	4.03					
United Kingdom	18.67	20.96	8.18	10.77	6.80	6.21	7.03	10.46	10.29
United States	3.64	7.30	2.19	2.70	2.19	2.24	3.80	1.41	1.56
Venezuela	10.47	8.58							

== See also ==
- List of countries by government budget
- List of countries by government budget per capita
- List of countries by tax revenue
- List of sovereign states in Europe by budget revenues
- List of sovereign states in Europe by budget revenues per capita
- List of U.S. state budgets
