= List of countries by government budget =

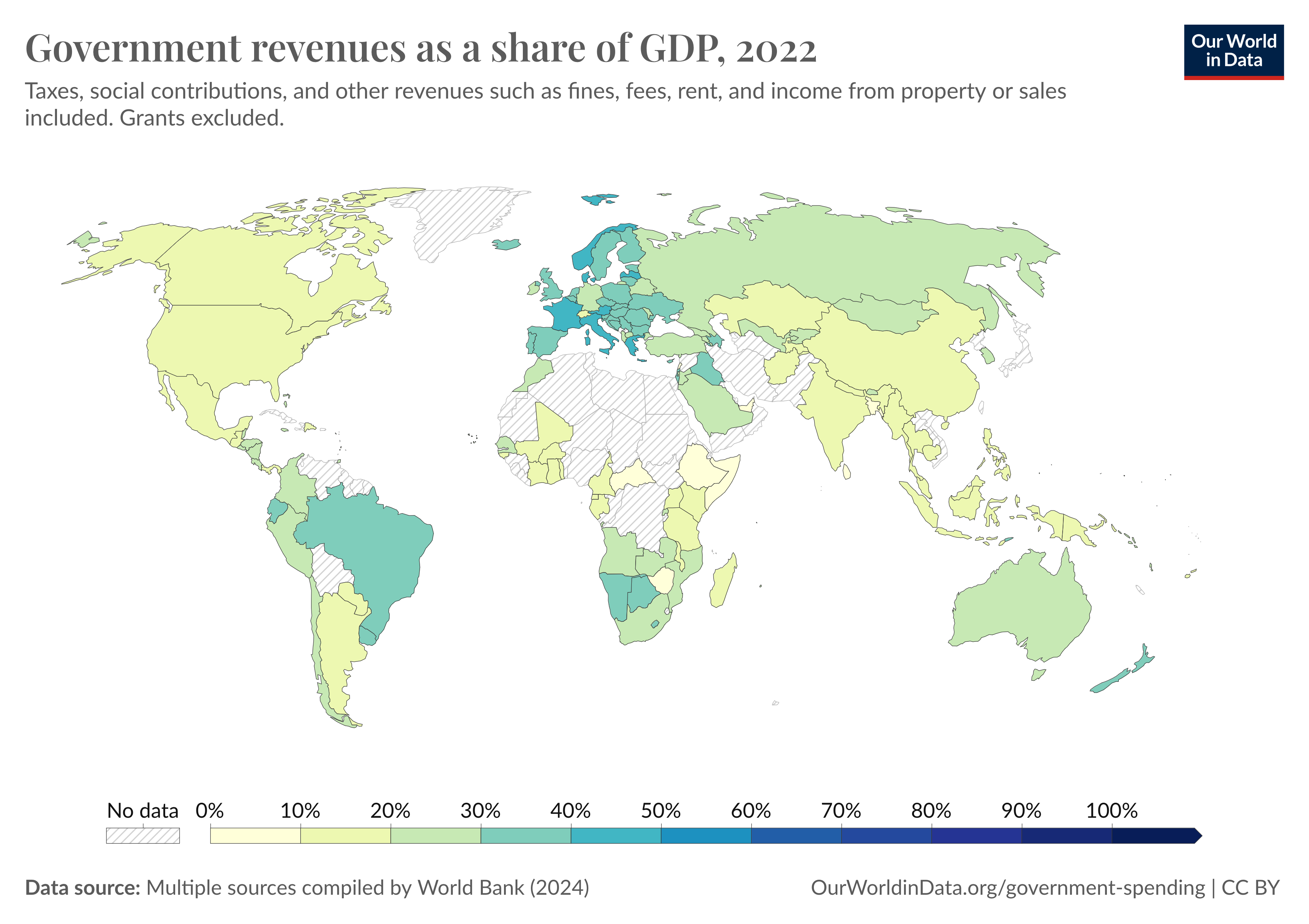
Global map of total central government revenues, as share of GDP, 2022

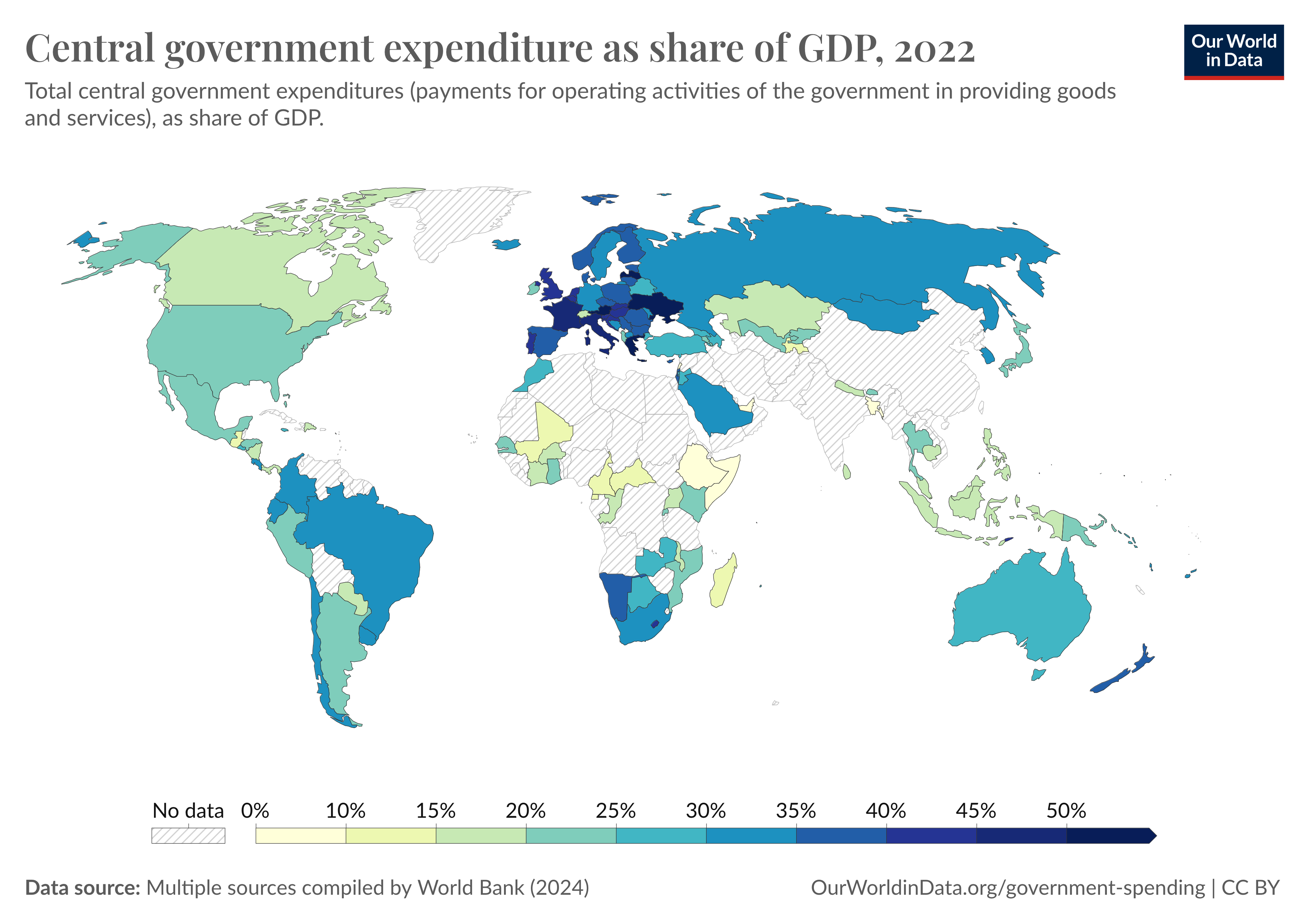
Global map of total central government expenditures, as share of GDP, 2022

Government budget balance in % of GDP for year 2025: Below -10 -10 to -5 -5 to -3 -3 to -2 -2 to -1 -1 to 0 / 0 to 1 1 to 2 2 to 3 Above 3 No data

This is the list of countries by government budget. The list includes sovereign states and self-governing dependent territories based upon the ISO standard ISO 3166-1. The following tables show the governmental budget balance, in millions of US dollars or millions of local currency units (LCU, the most commonly used in the country) and as percentage of GDP, based on data published by International Monetary Fund, World Bank, and Central Intelligence Agency.

According to International Monetary Fund, "revenue consists of taxes, social contributions, grants receivable, and other revenue. Revenue increases government's net worth, which is the difference between its assets and liabilities (GFSM 2001, paragraph 4.20). Total expenditure consists of total expense and the net acquisition of nonfinancial assets. Apart from being on an accrual basis, total expenditure differs from the GFSM 1986 definition of total expenditure in the sense that it also takes the disposals of nonfinancial assets into account. Net lending (+) / borrowing (−) is calculated as revenue minus total expenditure. This is a core GFS balance that measures the extent to which general government is either putting financial resources at the disposal of other sectors in the economy and non-residents (net lending), or utilizing the financial resources generated by other sectors and non-residents (net borrowing). This balance may be viewed as an indicator of the financial impact of general government activity on the rest of the economy and non-residents (GFSM 2001, paragraph 4.17). Net lending (+)/borrowing (−) is also equal to net acquisition of financial assets minus net incurrence of liabilities."

According to World Bank, "revenue is cash receipts from taxes, social contributions, and other revenues such as fines, fees, rent, and income from property or sales. Grants are also considered as revenue but are excluded here. Grants and other revenue include grants from other foreign governments, international organizations, and other government units; interest; dividends; rent; requited, nonrepayable receipts for public purposes (such as fines, administrative fees, and entrepreneurial income from government ownership of property); and voluntary, unrequited, nonrepayable receipts other than grants. Expense is cash payments for operating activities of the government in providing goods and services. It includes compensation of employees (such as wages and salaries), interest and subsidies, grants, social benefits, and other expenses such as rent and dividends."

According to Central Intelligence Agency, "budget surplus (+) or deficit (−) records the difference between national government revenues and expenditures, expressed as a percent of GDP. A positive (+) number indicates that revenues exceeded expenditures (a budget surplus), while a negative (−) number indicates the reverse (a budget deficit). Normalizing the data, by dividing the budget balance by GDP, enables easy comparisons across countries and indicates whether a national government saves or borrows money. Countries with high budget deficits (relative to their GDPs) generally have more difficulty raising funds to finance expenditures, than those with lower deficits."

== International Monetary Fund ==
In the following table, for each country or territory, governments' revenue, expenditure, and net lending (+)/borrowing (-) figures from the IMF are shown, expressed as a percentage of GDP and in current USD, calculated on an exchange rate basis, i.e., not in purchasing power parity (PPP) terms. Sorting is alphabetical by ISO 3166-1 alpha-3 country code.

Values are based upon GDP in national currency converted to U.S. dollars using market exchange rates (yearly average). Exchange rate projections are provided by country economists for the group of other emerging market and developing countries. Exchanges rates for advanced economies are established in the WEO assumptions for each WEO exercise. Expenditure-based GDP is total final expenditures at purchasers' prices (including the f.o.b. value of exports of goods and services), less the f.o.b. value of imports of goods and services.

Government budget (billion USD, current prices)
| Country/Territory Region/Group | GDP (billion USD) | Revenue (Note: Revenue consists of taxes, social contributions, grants receivable, and other revenue. Revenue increases government's net worth, which is the difference between its assets and liabilities (GFSM 2001, paragraph 4.20). Note: Transactions that merely change the composition of the balance sheet do not change the net worth position, for example, proceeds from sales of nonfinancial and financial assets or incurrence of liabilities.) | | Expenditure (Note: Total expenditure consists of total expense and the net acquisition of nonfinancial assets. Note: Apart from being on an accrual basis, total expenditure differs from the GFSM 1986 definition of total expenditure in the sense that it also takes the disposals of nonfinancial assets into account.) | | General net lending/borrowing (Note: Net lending (+)/borrowing (-) is calculated as revenue minus total expenditure. This is a core GFS balance that measures the extent to which general government is either putting financial resources at the disposal of other sectors in the economy and nonresidents (net lending), or utilizing the financial resources generated by other sectors and nonresidents (net borrowing). This balance may be viewed as an indicator of the financial impact of general government activity on the rest of the economy and nonresidents (GFSM 2001, paragraph 4.17). Note: Net lending (+)/borrowing (-) is also equal to net acquisition of financial assets minus net incurrence of liabilities.) | | Year |
| Country/Territory Region/Group | GDP (billion USD) | billion USD | % of GDP | billion USD | % of GDP | billion USD | % of GDP | Year |
|---|---|---|---|---|---|---|---|---|
| Aruba | 4.26 | 1.80 | 23.60% | 1.62 | 21.25% | 0.48 | 2.35% | 2025 |
| Afghanistan | 17.33 | 2.69 | 15.53% | 2.93 | 16.89% | −0.24 | −1.36% | 2025 |
| Angola | 113.29 | 20.40 | 18.01% | 17.60 | 15.54% | 2.80 | 2.47% | 2025 |
| Albania | 26.13 | 7.48 | 28.62% | 8.05 | 30.82% | −0.57 | −2.20% | 2024 |
| Andorra | 3.93 | 1.51 | 38.41% | 1.44 | 36.70% | 0.07 | 1.71% | 2024 |
| United Arab Emirates | 545.05 | 154.19 | 28.29% | 128.03 | 23.49% | 26.16 | 4.80% | 2024 |
| Argentina | 604.38 | 192.92 | 31.92% | 193.46 | 32.01% | −0.54 | −0.09% | 2024 |
| Armenia | 25.25 | 6.35 | 25.16% | 7.55 | 29.91% | −1.20 | −4.75% | 2024 |
| Antigua and Barbuda | 2.29 | 0.40 | 17.36% | 0.42 | 18.47% | −0.02 | −1.11% | 2024 |
| Australia | 1802.00 | 655.03 | 36.35% | 684.94 | 38.01% | −29.91 | −1.66% | 2024 |
| Austria | 535.80 | 267.90 | 50.00% | 285.96 | 53.37% | −18.06 | −3.37% | 2024 |
| Azerbaijan | 75.65 | 24.86 | 25.58% | 24.80 | 32.78% | 0.78 | 1.03% | 2024 |
| Burundi | 4.29 | 0.99 | 23.04% | 1.31 | 30.42% | −0.32 | −7.38% | 2024 |
| Belgium | 662.18 | 334.33 | 50.49% | 365.19 | 55.15% | −30.86 | −4.66% | 2024 |
| Benin | 21.32 | 3.25 | 15.25% | 4.04 | 18.95% | −0.79 | −3.70% | 2024 |
| Burkina Faso | 21.86 | 4.78 | 21.85% | 6.02 | 27.57% | −1.24 | −5.69% | 2024 |
| Bangladesh | 451.47 | 39.91 | 8.84% | 60.86 | 13.48% | −20.95 | −4.64% | 2024 |
| Bulgaria | 108.43 | 39.62 | 36.54% | 42.80 | 39.47% | −3.18 | −2.93% | 2024 |
| Bahrain | 47.81 | 8.85 | 20.68% | 12.13 | 28.34% | −3.27 | −7.65% | 2024 |
| Bahamas | 14.83 | 3.07 | 20.75% | 3.26 | 22.01% | −0.19 | −1.26% | 2024 |
| Bosnia and Herzegovina | 29.08 | 12.06 | 41.46% | 12.77 | 43.93% | −0.72 | −2.47% | 2024 |
| Belarus | 73.13 | 30.73 | 42.02% | 29.93 | 40.93% | 0.80 | 1.09% | 2024 |
| Belize | 3.34 | 0.77 | 22.98% | 0.80 | 23.89% | −0.03 | −0.91% | 2024 |
| Bolivia | 48.17 | 12.98 | 26.95% | 18.01 | 37.38% | −5.03 | −10.44% | 2024 |
| Brazil | 2188.42 | 860.05 | 39.30% | 1011.71 | 46.23% | −151.66 | −6.93% | 2024 |
| Barbados | 7.20 | 1.90 | 26.47% | 2.02 | 28.08% | −0.12 | −1.62% | 2024 |
| Brunei | 15.71 | 3.09 | 19.66% | 4.65 | 29.59% | −1.56 | −9.92% | 2024 |
| Bhutan | 3.15 | 0.76 | 24.20% | 0.90 | 28.81% | −0.14 | −4.61% | 2024 |
| Botswana | 19.97 | 5.83 | 29.22% | 7.05 | 35.33% | −1.22 | −6.12% | 2024 |
| Central African Republic | 2.82 | 0.42 | 14.77% | 0.50 | 17.84% | −0.09 | −3.08% | 2024 |
| Canada | 2214.80 | 914.05 | 41.27% | 958.12 | 43.26% | −43.85 | −1.98% | 2024 |
| Switzerland | 942.27 | 302.94 | 32.15% | 297.29 | 31.55% | 5.65 | 0.60% | 2024 |
| Chile | 328.72 | 81.26 | 24.72% | 88.89 | 27.04% | −7.63 | −2.32% | 2024 |
| China | 18273.36 | 4829.65 | 26.43% | 6181.88 | 33.86% | −1357.71 | −7.43% | 2024 |
| Ivory Coast | 86.99 | 14.58 | 16.76% | 18.10 | 20.81% | −3.52 | −4.05% | 2024 |
| Cameroon | 53.39 | 8.56 | 16.03% | 8.80 | 16.48% | −0.25 | −0.46% | 2024 |
| Democratic Republic of the Congo | 72.48 | 11.01 | 15.19% | 12.47 | 17.21% | −1.46 | −2.02% | 2024 |
| Republic of the Congo | 15.04 | 3.94 | 26.23% | 3.37 | 22.41% | 0.57 | 3.82% | 2024 |
| Colombia | 417.21 | 120.11 | 28.79% | 138.43 | 33.18% | −18.31 | −4.39% | 2024 |
| Comoros | 1.45 | 0.25 | 17.60% | 0.29 | 20.40% | −0.04 | −2.79% | 2024 |
| Cape Verde | 2.76 | 0.74 | 26.90% | 0.82 | 29.78% | −0.08 | −2.88% | 2024 |
| Costa Rica | 95.15 | 14.18 | 14.90% | 17.71 | 18.61% | −3.53 | −3.71% | 2024 |
| Cyprus | 34.79 | 15.40 | 44.26% | 14.30 | 41.11% | 1.09 | 3.14% | 2024 |
| Czech Republic | 342.99 | 142.24 | 41.47% | 152.08 | 44.34% | −9.84 | −2.87% | 2024 |
| Germany | 4710.03 | 2174.62 | 46.17% | 2268.82 | 48.17% | −94.20 | −2.00% | 2024 |
| Djibouti | 4.33 | 0.75 | 17.39% | 0.95 | 21.86% | −0.19 | −4.47% | 2024 |
| Dominica | 0.70 | 0.43 | 62.09% | 0.45 | 64.67% | −0.02 | −2.58% | 2024 |
| Denmark | 412.29 | 204.33 | 49.56% | 196.95 | 47.77% | 7.38 | 1.79% | 2024 |
| Dominican Republic | 126.24 | 20.61 | 16.33% | 24.46 | 19.38% | −3.85 | −3.05% | 2024 |
| Algeria | 260.13 | 75.96 | 29.20% | 100.01 | 38.48% | −24.14 | −9.28% | 2024 |
| Ecuador | 121.43 | 46.86 | 38.59% | 49.29 | 40.59% | −2.43 | −2.00% | 2024 |
| Egypt | 380.04 | 63.24 | 16.64% | 101.77 | 26.78% | −38.54 | −10.14% | 2024 |
| Eritrea | 2.11 | 0.66 | 31.11% | 0.75 | 35.46% | −0.09 | −4.36% | 2020 |
| Spain | 1731.47 | 724.79 | 41.86% | 776.04 | 44.82% | −51.08 | −2.95% | 2024 |
| Estonia | 43.04 | 18.07 | 41.99% | 19.35 | 44.96% | −1.28 | −2.98% | 2024 |
| Ethiopia | 145.03 | 11.20 | 7.72% | 13.66 | 9.42% | −2.46 | −1.70% | 2024 |
| Finland | 306.08 | 162.50 | 53.09% | 173.76 | 56.77% | −11.26 | −3.68% | 2024 |
| Fiji | 5.77 | 1.54 | 26.65% | 1.78 | 30.88% | −0.24 | −4.23% | 2024 |
| France | 3174.10 | 1627.36 | 51.27% | 1816.85 | 57.24% | −189.18 | −5.96% | 2024 |
| Federated States of Micronesia | 0.48 | 0.31 | 64.13% | 0.30 | 62.86% | 0.006 | 1.27% | 2024 |
| Gabon | 20.90 | 4.08 | 19.52% | 4.89 | 23.41% | −0.81 | −3.89% | 2024 |
| United Kingdom | 3587.54 | 1403.80 | 39.13% | 1556.27 | 43.38% | −152.47 | −4.25% | 2024 |
| Georgia | 33.19 | 9.36 | 28.19% | 10.19 | 30.70% | −0.83 | −2.50% | 2024 |
| Ghana | 75.31 | 12.73 | 16.91% | 16.29 | 21.63% | −3.55 | −4.72% | 2024 |
| Guinea | 25.47 | 3.50 | 13.75% | 4.27 | 16.75% | −0.76 | −3.00% | 2024 |
| Gambia | 2.69 | 0.54 | 20.07% | 0.61 | 22.80% | −0.07 | −2.73% | 2024 |
| Guinea-Bissau | 2.19 | 0.35 | 15.79% | 0.43 | 19.58% | −0.08 | −3.79% | 2024 |
| Equatorial Guinea | 12.88 | 2.78 | 21.56% | 2.39 | 18.56% | 0.38 | 2.99% | 2024 |
| Greece | 252.73 | 120.27 | 47.59% | 122.80 | 48.59% | −2.53 | −1.01% | 2024 |
| Grenada | 1.39 | 0.57 | 41.29% | 0.55 | 39.56% | 0.02 | 1.73% | 2024 |
| Guatemala | 112.37 | 13.98 | 12.44% | 15.20 | 13.53% | −1.22 | −1.09% | 2024 |
| Guyana | 23.03 | 4.08 | 17.73% | 5.52 | 23.96% | −1.43 | −6.23% | 2024 |
| Hong Kong | 401.75 | 78.86 | 19.63% | 96.78 | 24.09% | −17.92 | −4.46% | 2024 |
| Honduras | 36.74 | 9.37 | 25.52% | 9.93 | 27.02% | −0.56 | −1.52% | 2024 |
| Croatia | 89.67 | 41.43 | 46.20% | 43.70 | 48.73% | −2.26 | −2.52% | 2024 |
| Haiti | 26.27 | 3.07 | 11.68% | 1.21 | 4.61% | 1.86 | 7.07% | 2024 |
| Hungary | 228.81 | 100.10 | 43.75% | 111.43 | 48.70% | −11.33 | −4.95% | 2024 |
| Indonesia | 1402.59 | 200.15 | 14.27% | 237.45 | 16.93% | −37.31 | −2.66% | 2024 |
| India | 3889.13 | 826.83 | 21.26% | 1129.40 | 29.04% | −302.57 | −7.78% | 2024 |
| Ireland | 560.57 | 155.33 | 27.71% | 134.26 | 23.95% | 21.08 | 3.76% | 2024 |
| Iran | 434.24 | 50.28 | 11.58% | 63.70 | 14.67% | −13.37 | −3.08% | 2024 |
| Iraq | 264.15 | 114.72 | 43.43% | 127.93 | 48.43% | −0.77 | −5.01% | 2024 |
| Iceland | 32.92 | 14.34 | 43.55% | 15.36 | 46.66% | −1.02 | −3.11% | 2024 |
| Israel | 528.07 | 184.14 | 34.87% | 231.87 | 43.91% | −47.74 | −9.04% | 2024 |
| Italy | 2376.51 | 1107.93 | 46.62% | 1202.75 | 50.61% | −94.82 | −3.99% | 2024 |
| Jamaica | 20.59 | 6.51 | 31.61% | 6.44 | 31.31% | 0.06 | 0.30% | 2024 |
| Jordan | 53.31 | 13.84 | 25.97% | 17.87 | 33.52% | −3.56 | −7.55% | 2024 |
| Japan | 4070.09 | 1469.30 | 36.10% | 1717.58 | 42.20% | −247.87 | −6.09% | 2024 |
| Kazakhstan | 292.55 | 57.84 | 19.77% | 64.65 | 22.10% | −6.82 | −2.33% | 2024 |
| Kenya | 116.32 | 20.40 | 17.54% | 26.26 | 22.58% | −5.86 | −5.04% | 2024 |
| Kyrgyzstan | 15.77 | 5.65 | 35.82% | 5.57 | 35.32% | 0.08 | 0.5% | 2024 |
| Cambodia | 47.15 | 7.09 | 15.03% | 8.16 | 17.31% | −1.07 | −2.28% | 2024 |
| Kiribati | 0.31 | 0.32 | 103.19% | 0.39 | 125.58% | −0.07 | −22.39% | 2024 |
| Saint Kitts and Nevis | 1.16 | 0.43 | 37.47% | 0.48 | 41.59% | −0.05 | −4.13% | 2024 |
| South Korea | 1869.92 | 413.63 | 22.12% | 423.35 | 22.64% | −9.91 | −0.53% | 2024 |
| Kuwait | 161.82 | 121.83 | 75.28% | 80.46 | 49.72% | 40.36 | 25.56% | 2024 |
| Laos | 14.95 | 2.46 | 16.53% | 2.54 | 17.03% | −0.7 | −0.5% | 2024 |
| Lebanon | 24.02 | 3.09 | 12.88% | 3.19 | 13.28% | −0.09 | −0.39% | 2023 |
| Liberia | 4.76 | 0.94 | 19.80% | 1.06 | 22.23% | −0.12 | −2.43% | 2024 |
| Libya | 44.81 | 28.58 | 63.79% | 30.73 | 68.57% | −2.14 | −4.78% | 2024 |
| Saint Lucia | 2.57 | 0.58 | 22.52% | 0.64 | 25.00% | −0.06 | −2.48% | 2024 |
| Sri Lanka | 74.59 | 6.23 | 8.36% | 13.87 | 18.59% | −7.62 | −10.22% | 2024 |
| Lesotho | 2.30 | 1.46 | 63.52% | 1.34 | 58.36% | 0.12 | 5.16% | 2024 |
| Lithuania | 82.79 | 32.07 | 38.74% | 33.41 | 40.35% | −1.34 | −1.61% | 2024 |
| Luxembourg | 91.21 | 42.87 | 47.00% | 44.05 | 48.30% | −1.19 | −1.30% | 2024 |
| Latvia | 45.52 | 17.60 | 38.67% | 19.17 | 42.12% | −1.57 | −3.44% | 2024 |
| Macau | 53.45 | 14.39 | 26.93% | 13.32 | 24.93% | 1.07 | 2.00% | 2024 |
| Morocco | 157.09 | 45.04 | 28.67% | 57.73 | 32.94% | −6.71 | −4.27% | 2024 |
| Moldova | 18.06 | 5.86 | 32.43% | 6.77 | 37.47% | −0.91 | −5.04% | 2024 |
| Madagascar | 17.21 | 2.33 | 12.98% | 2.88 | 16.74% | −0.65 | −3.76% | 2024 |
| Maldives | 6.98 | 2.18 | 31.27% | 3.43 | 49.15% | −1.25 | −17.88% | 2024 |
| Mexico | 1848.12 | 448.17 | 24.25% | 557.21 | 30.15% | −109.04 | −5.90% | 2024 |
| Marshall Islands | 0.28 | 0.20 | 71.25% | 0.20 | 71.00% | 0.0007 | 0.25% | 2024 |
| North Macedonia | 15.86 | 5.63 | 35.51% | 6.42 | 40.49% | −0.79 | −4.98% | 2024 |
| Mali | 21.65 | 4.84 | 22.37% | 5.62 | 25.97% | −0.78 | −3.60% | 2024 |
| Malta | 24.40 | 7.64 | 31.30% | 8.61 | 35.29% | −0.97 | −3.99% | 2024 |
| Myanmar | 64.28 | 11.29 | 17.56% | 15.01 | 23.35% | −3.72 | −5.79% | 2024 |
| Montenegro | 8.11 | 3.36 | 41.45% | 3.61 | 44.52% | −0.25 | −3.06% | 2024 |
| Mongolia | 23.67 | 8.91 | 37.64% | 8.81 | 37.24% | 0.09 | 0.40% | 2024 |
| Mozambique | 22.50 | 6.36 | 28.25% | 7.31 | 32.50% | −0.96 | −4.25% | 2024 |
| Mauritania | 10.76 | 2.60 | 24.19% | 2.73 | 25.37% | −0.13 | −1.18% | 2024 |
| Mauritius | 15.89 | 4.34 | 27.30% | 4.81 | 30.30% | −0.48 | −3.00% | 2024 |
| Malawi | 10.84 | 2.31 | 21.28% | 3.18 | 29.31% | −0.87 | −8.03% | 2024 |
| Malaysia | 439.75 | 80.03 | 18.20% | 90.82 | 21.79% | −15.79 | −3.59% | 2024 |
| Namibia | 13.19 | 4.30 | 32.60% | 4.84 | 36.67% | −0.35 | −2.64% | 2024 |
| Niger | 19.60 | 2.39 | 12.19% | 3.18 | 16.25% | −0.80 | −4.06% | 2024 |
| Nigeria | 199.72 | 27.06 | 13.55% | 36.15 | 18.10% | −9.08 | −4.55% | 2024 |
| Nicaragua | 19.41 | 5.63 | 29.02% | 5.57 | 28.72% | 0.06 | 0.30% | 2024 |
| Netherlands | 1218.40 | 519.16 | 42.61% | 538.04 | 44.16% | −18.88 | −1.55% | 2024 |
| Norway | 503.75 | 292.88 | 58.14% | 232.53 | 46.16% | 60.35 | 11.98% | 2024 |
| Nepal | 43.67 | 8.43 | 19.31% | 10.48 | 24.00% | −2.05 | −4.69% | 2024 |
| Nauru | 0.16 | 0.25 | 153.93% | 0.20 | 123.74% | 0.05 | 30.19% | 2024 |
| New Zealand | 252.24 | 96.96 | 38.44% | 106.65 | 42.28% | −9.69 | −3.84% | 2024 |
| Oman | 109.99 | 32.25 | 32.05% | 29.74 | 27.04% | 5.52 | 5.02% | 2024 |
| Pakistan | 374.60 | 47.05 | 12.56% | 72.33 | 19.31% | −25.28 | −6.75% | 2024 |
| Panama | 87.35 | 15.45 | 17.69% | 19.17 | 21.95% | −3.72 | −4.26% | 2024 |
| Peru | 283.31 | 37.51 | 13.24% | 63.60 | 22.45% | −9.09 | −3.21% | 2024 |
| Philippines | 470.06 | 96.13 | 20.45% | 114.32 | 24.32% | −18.19 | −3.87% | 2024 |
| Palau | 0.32 | 0.18 | 55.47% | 0.17 | 51.87% | 0.01 | 3.6% | 2024 |
| Papua New Guinea | 31.90 | 5.84 | 18.31% | 7.09 | 22.22% | −1.25 | −3.92% | 2020 |
| Poland | 862.91 | 374.24 | 43.37% | 423.00 | 49.02% | −48.84 | −5.66% | 2024 |
| Puerto Rico | 120.97 | 27.13 | 22.43% | 27.77 | 22.96% | −0.64 | −0.53% | 2024 |
| Portugal | 303.03 | 131.81 | 43.46% | 131.18 | 43.25% | 0.67 | 0.22% | 2024 |
| Paraguay | 44.94 | 8.37 | 18.63% | 9.42 | 20.96% | −1.05 | −2.33% | 2024 |
| Qatar | 221.41 | 60.89 | 27.50% | 56.50 | 25.52% | 4.38 | 1.98% | 2024 |
| Romania | 380.56 | 119.72 | 31.46% | 149.37 | 39.25% | −29.64 | −7.79% | 2024 |
| Russia | 2184.32 | 774.34 | 35.45% | 815.19 | 37.32% | −40.85 | −1.87% | 2024 |
| Rwanda | 13.66 | 3.09 | 22.64% | 4.09 | 29.92% | −0.99 | −7.28% | 2024 |
| Saudi Arabia | 1100.71 | 326.80 | 29.69% | 360.15 | 32.72% | −33.35 | −3.03% | 2024 |
| Sudan | 29.79 | 1.09 | 3.65% | 1.91 | 6.41% | −0.82 | −2.76% | 2024 |
| Senegal | 33.69 | 7.03 | 20.87% | 9.56 | 28.38% | −2.53 | −7.51% | 2024 |
| Singapore | 530.71 | 97.92 | 18.45% | 74.09 | 13.96% | 23.83 | 4.49% | 2024 |
| Solomon Islands | 1.73 | 0.51 | 29.37% | 0.55 | 31.58% | −0.04 | −2.21% | 2024 |
| Sierra Leone | 7.41 | 0.93 | 12.55% | 1.14 | 15.45% | −0.21 | −2.89% | 2024 |
| El Salvador | 35.85 | 9.50 | 26.51% | 11.11 | 30.99% | −1.61 | −4.48% | 2024 |
| San Marino | 2.05 | 0.41 | 20.02% | 0.45 | 21.82% | −0.04 | −1.81% | 2024 |
| Somalia | 8.16 | 0.72 | 8.85% | 0.72 | 8.82% | 0.00 | 0.03% | 2022 |
| Serbia | 82.55 | 36.16 | 43.80% | 38.29 | 46.39% | −2.14 | −2.59% | 2024 |
| South Sudan | 5.07 | 1.50 | 29.67% | 1.21 | 23.84% | 0.29 | 5.83% | 2024 |
| São Tomé and Príncipe | 0.81 | 0.21 | 25.83% | 0.18 | 21.85% | 0.03 | 3.98% | 2024 |
| Suriname | 4.92 | 1.28 | 26.07% | 1.31 | 26.65% | −0.22 | −0.57% | 2024 |
| Slovakia | 142.62 | 58.39 | 40.94% | 66.77 | 46.82% | −8.40 | −5.89% | 2024 |
| Slovenia | 73.20 | 33.06 | 45.17% | 34.95 | 47.75% | −1.90 | −2.59% | 2024 |
| Sweden | 609.04 | 286.49 | 47.04% | 293.62 | 48.21% | −7.13 | −1.17% | 2024 |
| Eswatini | 5.15 | 1.53 | 29.68% | 1.62 | 31.42% | −0.09 | −1.74% | 2024 |
| Seychelles | 2.14 | 0.72 | 33.85% | 0.75 | 35.23% | −0.03 | −1.37% | 2024 |
| Syria | 60.04 | 12.52 | 20.85% | 17.19 | 28.64% | −4.68 | −7.79% | 2010 |
| Chad | 18.67 | 3.10 | 16.59% | 3.23 | 17.34% | −0.14 | −0.75% | 2024 |
| Togo | 9.77 | 1.85 | 18.99% | 2.33 | 23.86% | −0.48 | −4.88% | 2024 |
| Thailand | 528.92 | 110.49 | 20.89% | 123.34 | 23.32% | −12.85 | −2.43% | 2024 |
| Tajikistan | 13.00 | 3.54 | 27.26% | 3.86 | 29.71% | −0.32 | −2.46% | 2024 |
| Turkmenistan | 83.88 | 9.83 | 11.72% | 9.13 | 10.88% | 0.70 | 0.84% | 2024 |
| Timor-Leste | 1.99 | 0.94 | 47.03% | 1.75 | 88.16% | −0.82 | −41.13% | 2024 |
| Tonga | 0.57 | 0.30 | 52.46% | 0.28 | 49.00% | 0.02 | 3.45% | 2024 |
| Trinidad and Tobago | 28.14 | 6.74 | 23.96% | 8.63 | 30.68% | −1.89 | −6.72% | 2024 |
| Tunisia | 52.64 | 15.02 | 28.54% | 18.15 | 34.49% | −3.13 | −5.95% | 2024 |
| Turkey | 1344.32 | 391.87 | 29.15% | 461.64 | 34.34% | −69.77 | −5.19% | 2024 |
| Tuvalu | 0.07 | 0.07 | 99.56% | 0.07 | 103.46% | −0.004 | −6.04% | 2024 |
| Taiwan | 775.02 | 130.36 | 16.82% | 136.33 | 17.59% | −5.97 | −0.77% | 2024 |
| Tanzania | 79.87 | 12.83 | 16.06% | 15.14 | 18.96% | −2.32 | −2.90% | 2024 |
| Uganda | 55.59 | 8.23 | 14.80% | 10.96 | 19.72% | −2.74 | −4.93% | 2024 |
| Ukraine | 184.10 | 83.05 | 45.11% | 117.55 | 63.85% | −34.50 | −18.74% | 2024 |
| Uruguay | 82.48 | 23.53 | 28.53% | 26.00 | 31.52% | −2.47 | −2.99% | 2024 |
| United States | 29167.78 | 8721.17 | 29.90% | 10894.16 | 37.53% | −2225.50 | −7.63% | 2024 |
| Kosovo | 11.17 | 3.30 | 29.55% | 3.45 | 30.85% | −0.14 | −1.30% | 2024 |
| Uzbekistan | 112.65 | 28.35 | 25.17% | 32.34 | 28.71% | −3.99 | −3.54% | 2024 |
| Saint Vincent and the Grenadines | 1.17 | 0.33 | 28.60% | 0.45 | 38.63% | −0.12 | −10.04% | 2024 |
| Venezuela | 106.33 | 17.40 | 16.36% | 17.41 | 16.37% | −0.01 | −0.01% | 2024 |
| Vietnam | 468.49 | 82.55 | 17.62% | 94.68 | 20.21% | −12.09 | −2.58% | 2024 |
| Vanuatu | 1.17 | 0.38 | 32.49% | 0.46 | 39.21% | −0.08 | −6.72% | 2024 |
| West Bank and Gaza Strip | 18.75 | 5.17 | 27.57% | 5.35 | 28.51% | −0.18 | −0.94% | 2024 |
| Samoa | 1.07 | 0.36 | 33.87% | 0.35 | 32.52% | 0.01 | 1.34% | 2024 |
| Yemen | 16.19 | 1.20 | 7.39% | 1.77 | 10.93% | −0.57 | −3.54% | 2024 |
| South Africa | 403.05 | 108.66 | 26.96% | 133.73 | 33.18% | −25.11 | −6.23% | 2024 |
| Zambia | 25.91 | 5.54 | 21.39% | 7.12 | 27.48% | −1.58 | −6.10% | 2024 |
| Zimbabwe | 35.92 | 5.61 | 15.62% | 9.35 | 26.03% | −3.74 | −10.40% | 2024 |

== World Bank ==
In the following table, for each country or territory, revenue, grants, and expense figures from World Bank are shown, expressed in million current local currency units (LCUs) and as a percentage of GDP. Sorting is alphabetical by ISO 3166-1 alpha-3 country code.

Government budget (million LCU, current prices)
| Country/Territory Region/Group | Revenue (Note: Revenue is cash receipts from taxes, social contributions, and other revenues such as fines, fees, rent, and income from property or sales. Grants are also considered as revenue but are excluded here.) | | Grants (Note: Grants and other revenue include grants from other foreign governments, international organizations, and other government units; interest; dividends; rent; requited, nonrepayable receipts for public purposes (such as fines, administrative fees, and entrepreneurial income from government ownership of property); and voluntary, unrequited, nonrepayable receipts other than grants.) | | Expense (Note: Expense is cash payments for operating activities of the government in providing goods and services. It includes compensation of employees (such as wages and salaries), interest and subsidies, grants, social benefits, and other expenses such as rent and dividends.) | | Balance (Note: Balance is calculated as Revenue + Grants − Expense.) | | Year |
| Country/Territory Region/Group | million LCU | % of GDP | million LCU | % of GDP | million LCU | % of GDP | million LCU | % of GDP | Year |
|---|---|---|---|---|---|---|---|---|---|
| (United Nations) WORLD | | 24.03% | | 3.77% | | 31.78% | | −3.98% | 2021 |
| Afghanistan | 167614.54 | 13.04% | 487642.08 | 37.94% | 504158.95 | 39.22% | 151097.67 | 11.75% | 2017 |
| Angola | 6609488.02 | 21.79% | 3240919.33 | 10.69% | 5060617.58 | 16.68% | 4789789.76 | 15.79% | 2019 |
| Albania | 467544.81 | 25.19% | 104427.63 | 5.63% | 455436.57 | 24.54% | 116535.87 | 6.28% | 2021 |
| United Arab Emirates | 60339.58 | 3.24% | 58210.36 | 3.13% | 71552.16 | 3.84% | 46997.78 | 2.52% | 2022 |
| Argentina | 14817363.16 | 17.97% | 1373382.71 | 1.67% | 18106350.95 | 21.96% | −1915605.07 | −2.32% | 2022 |
| Armenia | 1994135.47 | 23.46% | 155858.03 | 1.83% | 1799140.89 | 21.16% | 350852.61 | 4.13% | 2022 |
| Australia | 610664.00 | 26.17% | 71284.00 | 3.06% | 644595.00 | 27.63% | 37353.00 | 1.60% | 2022 |
| Austria | 199292.11 | 44.56% | 17762.95 | 3.97% | 214159.36 | 47.89% | 2895.70 | 0.65% | 2022 |
| Azerbaijan | 34036.85 | 36.52% | 19135.04 | 20.53% | 25299.46 | 27.14% | 27872.43 | 29.91% | 2021 |
| Burundi | 1160696.12 | 17.55% | 376231.38 | 5.69% | 1000121.74 | 15.12% | 536805.77 | 8.12% | 2021 |
| Belgium | 209283.80 | 37.76% | 7340.50 | 1.32% | 223050.50 | 40.25% | −6426.20 | −1.16% | 2022 |
| Benin | 32629.00 | 12.93% | 14579.00 | 5.78% | | | | | |
| Burkina Faso | 2311212.80 | 19.69% | 499588.35 | 4.26% | 2443685.84 | 20.82% | 367115.31 | 3.13% | 2022 |
| Bangladesh | 3367377.39 | 9.54% | 692647.96 | 1.96% | 2938614.56 | 8.32% | 1121410.80 | 3.18% | 2021 |
| Bulgaria | 61570.93 | 36.69% | | | 66256.72 | 39.48% | | | |
| Bahrain | 2082.38 | 16.00% | 1701.95 | 13.07% | 3518.11 | 27.03% | 266.22 | 2.05% | 2020 |
| Bahamas | 2605.50 | 19.83% | 447.40 | 3.41% | 3102.43 | 23.62% | −49.54 | −0.38% | 2022 |
| Bosnia and Herzegovina | 16365.18 | 35.87% | 1260.62 | 2.76% | 15247.23 | 33.42% | 2378.57 | 5.21% | 2022 |
| Belarus | 50513.26 | 26.07% | 12270.96 | 6.33% | 54768.64 | 28.27% | 8015.58 | 4.14% | 2022 |
| Belize | 1078.95 | 23.80% | 141.37 | 3.12% | 1012.63 | 22.34% | 207.69 | 4.58% | 2017 |
| Bolivia | 23965.71 | 23.27% | 7442.02 | 7.22% | 22467.38 | 21.81% | 8940.35 | 8.68% | 2007 |
| Brazil | 2985200.69 | 29.62% | 649881.66 | 6.45% | 3440643.30 | 34.13% | 194439.04 | 1.93% | 2022 |
| Barbados | 2863.10 | 29.53% | 215.68 | 2.22% | 3267.46 | 33.70% | −188.68 | −1.95% | 2016 |
| Bhutan | 36473.35 | 20.03% | 32199.49 | 17.68% | 43844.47 | 24.08% | 24828.37 | 13.63% | 2020 |
| Botswana | 74040.30 | 29.46% | 24682.46 | 9.82% | 63069.39 | 25.09% | 35653.37 | 14.18% | 2022 |
| Central African Republic | 128450.45 | 9.20% | 85380.37 | 6.12% | 162731.85 | 11.66% | 51098.97 | 3.66% | 2021 |
| Canada | 510988.00 | 18.16% | 33928.00 | 1.21% | 520361.00 | 18.50% | 24555.00 | 0.87% | 2022 |
| Switzerland | 135926.83 | 17.39% | 13543.15 | 1.73% | 130189.68 | 16.66% | 19280.29 | 2.47% | 2022 |
| Chile | 68610736.49 | 26.00% | 9908508.30 | 3.76% | 63466177.27 | 24.05% | 15053067.52 | 5.71% | 2022 |
| China | 18085886.22 | 15.01% | 1310228.80 | 1.09% | | | | | |
| Ivory Coast | 5328822.10 | 12.17% | 334155.83 | 0.76% | 8145961.34 | 18.61% | −2482983.41 | −5.67% | 2022 |
| Cameroon | 3430280.24 | 13.75% | 654590.68 | 2.62% | 3100795.24 | 12.43% | 984075.68 | 3.94% | 2021 |
| Democratic Republic of the Congo | 18706387.08 | 14.16% | 8144307.45 | 6.17% | 17594787.14 | 13.32% | 9255907.39 | 7.01% | 2022 |
| Republic of the Congo | 1648486.87 | 20.05% | 1151155.20 | 14.00% | 1326271.54 | 16.13% | 1473370.53 | 17.92% | 2021 |
| Colombia | 364061866.68 | 24.77% | 132495564.42 | 9.01% | 481098335.07 | 32.73% | 15459096.03 | 1.05% | 2022 |
| Cape Verde | 38026.94 | 21.57% | 11370.47 | 6.45% | 54451.19 | 30.88% | −5053.78 | −2.87% | 2020 |
| Costa Rica | 13061927.88 | 29.15% | 1889053.43 | 4.22% | 12812765.92 | 28.59% | 2138215.39 | 4.77% | 2022 |
| Cyprus | 11057.83 | 39.81% | | | 10222.43 | 36.80% | | | |
| Czech Republic | 2130544.00 | 31.39% | 223407.00 | 3.29% | 2428163.00 | 35.78% | −74212.00 | −1.09% | 2022 |
| Germany | 1118839.00 | 28.86% | 61592.00 | 1.59% | 1243688.00 | 32.08% | −63257.00 | −1.63% | 2022 |
| Denmark | 1031451.00 | 36.43% | | | 925453.00 | 32.68% | | | |
| Dominican Republic | 1006924.60 | 16.08% | 136304.16 | 2.18% | 1106806.58 | 17.68% | 36422.18 | 0.58% | 2022 |
| Ecuador | 35957.76 | 30.84% | 14987.60 | 12.86% | 35346.97 | 30.32% | 15598.39 | 13.38% | 2022 |
| Egypt | 512941.00 | 20.99% | 232422.00 | 9.51% | 738800.00 | 30.23% | 6563.00 | 0.27% | 2015 |
| Spain | 409438.00 | 30.41% | 51606.00 | 3.83% | 488536.00 | 36.29% | −27492.00 | −2.04% | 2022 |
| Estonia | 12615.40 | 35.03% | 1420.66 | 3.95% | 12825.10 | 35.61% | 1210.96 | 3.36% | 2022 |
| Ethiopia | 311281.51 | 5.06% | 85329.62 | 1.39% | 457001.37 | 7.42% | −60390.24 | −0.98% | 2022 |
| Finland | 98193.00 | 36.68% | 11257.00 | 4.21% | 101601.00 | 37.96% | 7849.00 | 2.93% | 2022 |
| Fiji | 1694.84 | 19.01% | 694.10 | 7.79% | 3080.66 | 34.56% | −691.71 | −7.76% | 2021 |
| France | 1149693.10 | 43.56% | 76319.10 | 2.89% | 1293210.00 | 49.00% | −67197.80 | −2.55% | 2022 |
| Federated States of Micronesia | 110.77 | 29.78% | 111.58 | 29.99% | 87.36 | 23.48% | 134.99 | 36.29% | 2020 |
| Gabon | 1629812.73 | 14.54% | 580564.53 | 5.18% | 1515196.40 | 13.51% | 695180.86 | 6.20% | 2021 |
| United Kingdom | 921555.00 | 36.77% | 59878.00 | 2.39% | 1047369.00 | 41.79% | −65936.00 | −2.63% | 2022 |
| Georgia | 19300.00 | 26.49% | 2887.10 | 3.96% | 18168.70 | 24.94% | 4018.40 | 5.52% | 2022 |
| Ghana | 95532.67 | 15.55% | 21103.02 | 3.44% | 139325.28 | 22.68% | −22689.58 | −3.69% | 2022 |
| Guinea | 357014.00 | 8.26% | 153101.00 | 3.54% | 279476.00 | 6.47% | 230639.00 | 5.34% | 1992 |
| Gambia | 485.77 | 19.44% | 185.22 | 7.41% | 428.71 | 17.16% | 242.28 | 9.70% | 1990 |
| Guinea-Bissau | 104544.64 | 12.00% | 49215.99 | 5.65% | 123543.79 | 14.19% | 30216.85 | 3.47% | 2019 |
| Equatorial Guinea | 2258237.59 | 26.84% | 1695085.41 | 20.15% | 943025.00 | 11.21% | 3010298.00 | 35.78% | 2022 |
| Greece | 100046.00 | 48.42% | | | 105260.00 | 50.94% | | | |
| Guatemala | 95549.08 | 12.98% | 2898.83 | 0.39% | 103697.42 | 14.09% | −5249.52 | −0.71% | 2022 |
| Honduras | 127494.18 | 22.21% | 20525.76 | 3.58% | 140022.85 | 24.39% | 7997.09 | 1.39% | 2020 |
| Croatia | 24647.40 | 36.05% | 4385.17 | 6.41% | 26219.95 | 38.35% | 2812.62 | 4.11% | 2022 |
| Hungary | 25024497.00 | 37.94% | 4038872.00 | 6.12% | 27974723.00 | 42.42% | 1088646.00 | 1.65% | 2022 |
| Indonesia | 2966217400.98 | 15.14% | 709958491.38 | 3.62% | 3095692100.14 | 15.80% | 580483792.22 | 2.96% | 2022 |
| India | 24925890.00 | 13.19% | 2211770.00 | 1.17% | 29602800.00 | 15.66% | −2465140.00 | −1.30% | 2018 |
| Ireland | 112319.37 | 22.19% | | | 100200.42 | 19.79% | | | |
| Iran | 1042320000.00 | 25.38% | 545282000.00 | 13.28% | 806599000.00 | 19.64% | 781003000.00 | 19.01% | 2009 |
| Iraq | 106607512.38 | 38.60% | 102907419.20 | 37.26% | 76253083.98 | 27.61% | 133261847.60 | 48.26% | 2019 |
| Iceland | 1209982.91 | 31.16% | 227438.23 | 5.86% | 1284939.27 | 33.09% | 152481.87 | 3.93% | 2022 |
| Israel | 585392.67 | 33.19% | 70656.62 | 4.01% | 620935.29 | 35.20% | 35114.00 | 1.99% | 2022 |
| Italy | 790604.00 | 40.28% | 65089.00 | 3.32% | 963626.00 | 49.09% | −107933.00 | −5.50% | 2022 |
| Jamaica | 575401.10 | 29.25% | | | 586727.16 | 29.83% | | | |
| Jordan | 8121.80 | 23.51% | 2861.30 | 8.28% | 9970.20 | 28.86% | 1012.90 | 2.93% | 2022 |
| Japan | | | | | 117320600.00 | 20.96% | | | 2022 |
| Kazakhstan | 10358100.00 | 12.34% | 3055100.00 | 3.64% | 14369589.79 | 17.12% | −956389.79 | −1.14% | 2021 |
| Kenya | 2256663.00 | 18.76% | 621042.64 | 5.16% | 2490483.29 | 20.71% | 387222.35 | 3.22% | 2021 |
| Kyrgyzstan | 304989.80 | 29.88% | 73464.50 | 7.20% | 243263.30 | 23.83% | 135191.00 | 13.24% | 2022 |
| Cambodia | 20053165.45 | 18.15% | 3685989.37 | 3.34% | 20386125.09 | 18.45% | 3353029.72 | 3.03% | 2021 |
| Kiribati | 257.44 | 66.01% | 228.70 | 58.64% | 318.78 | 81.74% | 167.36 | 42.91% | 2022 |
| Saint Kitts and Nevis | 679.20 | 28.46% | 348.40 | 14.60% | 638.40 | 26.75% | 389.20 | 16.31% | 2020 |
| South Korea | 691857673.79 | 32.00% | 117894420.00 | 5.45% | 727286290.55 | 33.64% | 82465803.25 | 3.81% | 2022 |
| Kuwait | 3460.00 | 43.76% | 3342.00 | 42.27% | 3677.00 | 46.51% | 3125.00 | 39.52% | 1998 |
| Laos | 30208369.27 | 13.91% | 5818653.58 | 2.68% | 22396904.15 | 10.32% | 13630118.70 | 6.28% | 2022 |
| Lebanon | 18675312.12 | 6.87% | 3476706.00 | 1.28% | 17119044.05 | 6.30% | 5032974.07 | 1.85% | 2021 |
| Liberia | 278.20 | 32.20% | 0.00 | 0.00% | 297.00 | 34.38% | −18.80 | −2.18% | 1982 |
| Saint Lucia | 1047.24 | 19.41% | 136.46 | 2.53% | 950.28 | 17.61% | 233.42 | 4.33% | 2017 |
| Sri Lanka | 1979184.00 | 8.22% | 224041.00 | 0.93% | 3788232.00 | 15.74% | −1585007.00 | −6.59% | 2022 |
| Lesotho | 13851.00 | 36.99% | 6763.83 | 18.06% | 15497.46 | 41.38% | 5117.38 | 13.66% | 2022 |
| Lithuania | 22370.16 | 33.17% | 2083.56 | 3.09% | 22999.34 | 34.11% | 1454.37 | 2.16% | 2022 |
| Luxembourg | 31843.39 | 41.07% | | | 31388.65 | 40.49% | | | |
| Latvia | 15634.32 | 40.73% | 2250.03 | 5.86% | 18474.05 | 48.13% | −589.70 | −1.54% | 2022 |
| Macau | 41411.25 | 20.99% | 7265.99 | 3.68% | 98870.19 | 50.11% | −50192.96 | −25.44% | 2022 |
| Morocco | 357759.78 | 26.90% | 65073.06 | 4.89% | 375322.89 | 28.22% | 47509.95 | 3.57% | 2022 |
| Moldova | 80463.20 | 29.34% | 7935.30 | 2.89% | 88509.70 | 32.28% | −111.20 | −0.04% | 2022 |
| Madagascar | 6398076.33 | 10.21% | 1033774.46 | 1.65% | 6238020.89 | 9.95% | 1193829.90 | 1.90% | 2022 |
| Maldives | 20007.40 | 24.77% | 5917.79 | 7.33% | 23799.85 | 29.46% | 2125.34 | 2.63% | 2021 |
| Mexico | 5689908.35 | 19.32% | 1051726.85 | 3.57% | 6585895.98 | 22.36% | 155739.22 | 0.53% | 2022 |
| Marshall Islands | 75.63 | 31.41% | 129.79 | 53.91% | 143.73 | 59.70% | 61.68 | 25.62% | 2020 |
| North Macedonia | 210348.60 | 28.84% | 19153.10 | 2.63% | 243122.00 | 33.33% | −13620.30 | −1.87% | 2021 |
| Mali | 1508574.76 | 15.01% | 211488.85 | 2.10% | 1457773.82 | 14.50% | 262289.79 | 2.61% | 2020 |
| Malta | 5798.20 | 33.26% | | | 6572.90 | 37.71% | | | |
| Myanmar | 16207030.01 | 14.39% | 9708981.78 | 8.62% | 15515825.93 | 13.78% | 10400185.86 | 9.23% | 2019 |
| Mongolia | 12626829.29 | 28.99% | 3533275.16 | 8.11% | 13805628.87 | 31.70% | 2354475.58 | 5.41% | 2021 |
| Mozambique | 296243.82 | 25.21% | 70021.83 | 5.96% | 313538.20 | 26.68% | 52727.44 | 4.49% | 2022 |
| Mauritius | 136266.13 | 23.86% | 20171.63 | 3.53% | 161141.50 | 28.21% | −4703.74 | −0.82% | 2022 |
| Malawi | 1667456.68 | 13.38% | 502380.76 | 4.03% | 2379639.82 | 19.10% | −209802.38 | −1.68% | 2022 |
| Malaysia | 294355.80 | 16.43% | 85590.80 | 4.78% | 321219.00 | 17.93% | 58727.60 | 3.28% | 2022 |
| Namibia | 64326.75 | 31.30% | 7990.07 | 3.89% | 73430.23 | 35.72% | −1113.41 | −0.54% | 2022 |
| Niger | 77430.00 | 14.61% | 11827.00 | 2.23% | 53872.00 | 10.16% | 35385.00 | 6.68% | 1980 |
| Nicaragua | 120619.70 | 21.48% | 10427.00 | 1.86% | 93605.03 | 16.67% | 37441.67 | 6.67% | 2022 |
| Netherlands | 377019.00 | 39.33% | 25033.00 | 2.61% | 378611.00 | 39.50% | 23441.00 | 2.45% | 2022 |
| Norway | 3216350.00 | 56.35% | | | 1678119.00 | 29.40% | | | |
| Nepal | 865379.33 | 19.88% | 139770.38 | 3.21% | 846217.69 | 19.44% | 158932.02 | 3.65% | 2021 |
| Nauru | 258.21 | 138.82% | 207.74 | 111.69% | 192.69 | 103.60% | 273.26 | 146.91% | 2020 |
| New Zealand | 130792.45 | 33.61% | 12182.09 | 3.13% | 139802.29 | 35.93% | 3172.24 | 0.82% | 2022 |
| Pakistan | 569291.00 | 11.06% | 145284.00 | 2.82% | 657598.00 | 12.78% | 56977.00 | 1.11% | 2000 |
| Panama | 7518.34 | 11.15% | 2541.37 | 3.77% | 11552.59 | 17.14% | −1492.88 | −2.21% | 2021 |
| Peru | 181603.89 | 20.67% | 28384.78 | 3.23% | 200658.80 | 22.84% | 9329.87 | 1.06% | 2021 |
| Philippines | 3542751.00 | 16.08% | 323544.00 | 1.47% | 4098777.00 | 18.61% | −232482.00 | −1.06% | 2022 |
| Palau | 62.72 | 24.01% | 80.93 | 30.99% | 152.68 | 58.46% | −9.04 | −3.46% | 2020 |
| Papua New Guinea | 17066.12 | 15.34% | 2084.65 | 1.87% | 21665.11 | 19.48% | −2514.35 | −2.26% | 2022 |
| Poland | 1047486.00 | 34.07% | | | 1114870.00 | 36.26% | | | |
| Portugal | 92127.83 | 38.02% | 9683.50 | 4.00% | 95718.52 | 39.50% | 6092.82 | 2.51% | 2022 |
| Paraguay | 50960257.80 | 17.40% | 8002924.82 | 2.73% | 48439969.80 | 16.54% | 10523212.82 | 3.59% | 2022 |
| Palestine | 4236.05 | 23.39% | 663.09 | 3.66% | 4738.49 | 26.17% | 160.65 | 0.89% | 2021 |
| Romania | 439221.60 | 31.34% | 40465.29 | 2.89% | 516497.40 | 36.86% | −36810.51 | −2.63% | 2022 |
| Russia | 42379545.00 | 27.31% | 28324692.00 | 18.25% | 49276379.00 | 31.75% | 21427858.00 | 13.81% | 2022 |
| Rwanda | 2052075.86 | 21.38% | 864541.80 | 9.01% | 2066286.12 | 21.53% | 850331.53 | 8.86% | 2020 |
| Saudi Arabia | 1268163.72 | 30.51% | 945069.63 | 22.73% | 1020845.15 | 24.56% | 1192388.21 | 28.68% | 2022 |
| Sudan | 56106.70 | 8.77% | 10607.20 | 1.66% | 62195.00 | 9.73% | 4518.90 | 0.71% | 2016 |
| Senegal | 3838550.63 | 22.28% | 624724.67 | 3.63% | 4007289.65 | 23.26% | 455985.65 | 2.65% | 2022 |
| Singapore | 111472.40 | 16.22% | 28776.64 | 4.19% | 104017.67 | 15.14% | 36231.37 | 5.27% | 2022 |
| Solomon Islands | 2945.78 | 23.06% | 916.98 | 7.18% | 3455.71 | 27.05% | 407.05 | 3.19% | 2022 |
| El Salvador | 8299.00 | 28.57% | 2075.50 | 7.15% | 8569.90 | 29.51% | 1804.60 | 6.21% | 2021 |
| San Marino | 772.51 | 40.33% | 259.78 | 13.56% | 776.49 | 44.07% | 255.80 | 13.35% | 2021 |
| Somalia | 211.28 | 0.00% | 366.96 | 0.00% | 472.81 | 0.00% | 105.42 | | 2020 |
| Serbia | 2883343.02 | 40.62% | 266632.37 | 3.76% | 2645570.97 | 37.27% | 504404.42 | 7.11% | 2022 |
| Slovakia | 41671.28 | 37.97% | | | 43735.46 | 39.85% | | | |
| Slovenia | 22343.97 | 39.17% | | | 23141.51 | 40.57% | | | |
| Sweden | 1952485.00 | 32.70% | 181289.00 | 3.04% | 1890632.00 | 31.66% | 243142.00 | 4.07% | 2022 |
| Eswatini | 17828.81 | 24.86% | 683.54 | 0.95% | 17493.06 | 24.39% | 1019.29 | 1.42% | 2021 |
| Seychelles | 7156.22 | 29.38% | 1218.42 | 5.00% | 10773.34 | 44.23% | −2398.70 | −9.85% | 2020 |
| Togo | 767113.31 | 15.05% | 171550.73 | 3.37% | 823254.20 | 16.16% | 115409.84 | 2.26% | 2022 |
| Thailand | 3171243.54 | 18.25% | 554372.95 | 3.19% | 3736695.41 | 21.50% | −11078.91 | −0.06% | 2022 |
| Tajikistan | 20173.49 | 17.07% | 9021.04 | 7.63% | 12634.89 | 10.69% | 16559.64 | 14.01% | 2022 |
| Timor-Leste | 1651.39 | 51.53% | 1182.47 | 36.90% | 1684.31 | 52.56% | 1149.55 | 35.87% | 2022 |
| Tonga | 281.27 | 25.11% | 255.83 | 22.84% | 368.52 | 32.90% | 168.59 | 15.05% | 2020 |
| Trinidad and Tobago | 38476.30 | 23.96% | 7210.40 | 4.49% | 52832.90 | 32.90% | −7146.20 | −4.45% | 2019 |
| Tunisia | 22077.10 | 29.88% | 2063.40 | 2.79% | 24950.10 | 33.76% | −809.60 | −1.10% | 2012 |
| Turkey | 3866829.87 | 25.76% | 680640.37 | 4.53% | 4454063.36 | 29.67% | 93406.88 | 0.62% | 2022 |
| Tanzania | 24418138.84 | 14.00% | 4553970.00 | 2.61% | 29389883.63 | 16.85% | −417774.79 | −0.24% | 2022 |
| Uganda | 22424654.62 | 13.78% | 5017027.05 | 3.08% | 27573804.81 | 16.94% | −132123.14 | −0.08% | 2022 |
| Ukraine | 1726621.70 | 32.96% | 912991.20 | 17.43% | 3033172.80 | 57.89% | −393559.90 | −7.51% | 2022 |
| Uruguay | 694150.34 | 30.79% | 55803.34 | 2.47% | 780614.41 | 34.62% | −30660.73 | −1.36% | 2020 |
| United States | 5036987.30 | 19.57% | 217750.20 | 0.85% | 6306213.30 | 24.50% | −1051475.80 | −4.08% | 2022 |
| Uzbekistan | 129452333.58 | 21.38% | 19454241.26 | 3.21% | 127232651.35 | 21.01% | 21673923.49 | 3.58% | 2020 |
| Saint Vincent and the Grenadines | 582.62 | 25.57% | 68.92 | 3.02% | 563.61 | 24.73% | 87.93 | 3.86% | 2017 |
| Vanuatu | 31771.94 | 30.54% | 28913.81 | 27.80% | 35636.32 | 34.26% | 25049.43 | 24.08% | 2021 |
| Samoa | 726.07 | 33.47% | 318.81 | 14.70% | 761.04 | 35.08% | 283.85 | 13.08% | 2021 |
| South Africa | 2014836.78 | 30.40% | 249833.22 | 3.77% | 2228258.40 | 33.62% | 36411.60 | 0.55% | 2022 |
| Zambia | 97169.89 | 21.97% | 33625.81 | 7.60% | 111190.64 | 25.14% | 19605.06 | 4.43% | 2021 |
| Zimbabwe | 5650.50 | 8.12% | 467.77 | 0.67% | 7641.67 | 10.98% | −1523.40 | −2.19% | 2018 |
| Small Island Developing States (SIDS) | | | | | | | | | |
| SIDS: Pacific | | 25.40% | | | | 36.44% | | | 2021 |
| Least developed countries (LDCs) | | 14.82% | | 3.85% | | 13.38% | | 5.29% | 2019 |
| Low & middle income economies (WB) | | 18.42% | | | | | | | 2022 |
| Middle-income economies (WB) | | 18.48% | | | | | | | 2022 |
| Lower middle income economies (WB) | | 14.56% | | 3.05% | | 15.74% | | 1.86% | 2018 |
| Upper middle income economies (WB) | | 18.53% | | 2.85% | | | | | 2022 |
| High-income economies (WB) | | 27.37% | | 2.79% | | 29.88% | | 0.29% | 2022 |
| European Union | | 35.92% | | 3.31% | | 39.84% | | −0.61% | 2022 |
| Organisation for Economic Co-operation and Development (OECD) | | 27.29% | | 2.79% | | 29.95% | | 0.13% | 2022 |

== Central Intelligence Agency ==
In the following table, for each country or territory, revenues and expenditures figures from the CIA are shown, calculated on an exchange rate basis, i.e., not in purchasing power parity (PPP) terms. Budget surplus or deficit records the difference between national government revenues and expenditures, expressed as a percent of GDP. A positive (+) number indicates that revenues exceeded expenditures (a budget surplus), while a negative (-) number indicates the reverse (a budget deficit). Sorting is alphabetical by ISO 3166-1 alpha-3 country code.

Government budget (millions USD)
| Country/Territory Region/Group | Revenues (millions USD) | Expenditures (millions USD) | Budget surplus (+) or deficit (-) (millions USD) | Year | Surplus percentage of GDP | Rank | Year |
|---|---|---|---|---|---|---|---|
| (United Nations) WORLD | 21680000 | 23810000 | −2130000 | 2017 | | | |
| Aruba | 793 | 782 | 11 | 2019 | −2.7% | 121 | 2017 |
| Afghanistan | 5093 | 5293 | −200 | 2019 | −15.1% | 217 | 2017 |
| Angola | 17899 | 17244 | 655 | 2019 | −6.7% | 189 | 2017 |
| Anguilla | 81.92 | 80.32 | 1.60 | 2017 | 0.9% | 34 | 2017 |
| Albania | 4190 | 4489 | −299 | 2019 | −2.0% | 105 | 2017 |
| Andorra | 1872 | 2060 | −188 | 2016 | −6.9% | 192 | 2016 |
| United Arab Emirates (Note: United Arab Emirates: The UAE federal budget does not account for emirate-level spending in Abu Dhabi and Dubai) | 129741 | 127262 | 2479 | 2019 | −0.2% | 51 | 2017 |
| Argentina | 150823 | 170725 | −19902 | 2019 | −6.0% | 183 | 2017 |
| Armenia | 3258 | 3392 | −134 | 2019 | −4.8% | 167 | 2017 |
| American Samoa | 249 | 262.5 | −13.5 | 2016 | −2.1% | 106 | 2016 |
| Antigua and Barbuda | 278 | 357 | −79 | 2020 | −2.4% | 112 | 2017 |
| Australia | 479330 | 532579 | −53249 | 2019 | −0.5% | 60 | 2017 |
| Austria | 218480 | 215485 | 2995 | 2019 | −0.7% | 68 | 2017 |
| Azerbaijan | 19950 | 16001 | 3949 | 2019 | −1.6% | 93 | 2017 |
| Burundi | 747 | 1111 | −364 | 2020 | −5.7% | 177 | 2017 |
| Belgium | 267105 | 277492 | −10387 | 2019 | −1.0% | 79 | 2017 |
| Benin | 2024 | 2101 | −77 | 2019 | −6.2% | 186 | 2017 |
| Burkina Faso | 3212 | 3757 | −545 | 2019 | −7.9% | 198 | 2017 |
| Bangladesh | 30023 | 46379 | −16356 | 2019 | −3.2% | 136 | 2017 |
| Bulgaria | 24487 | 26544 | −2057 | 2020 | 1.8% | 16 | 2017 |
| Bahrain | 9168 | 12630 | −3462 | 2019 | −10.1% | 212 | 2017 |
| Bahamas | 2087 | 2899 | −812 | 2020 | −2.6% | 114 | 2017 |
| Bosnia and Herzegovina | 8434 | 8154 | 280 | 2019 | 2.1% | 15 | 2017 |
| Belarus | 24743 | 24239 | 504 | 2019 | 2.9% | 14 | 2017 |
| Belize | 583 | 656 | −73 | 2019 | −1.0% | 77 | 2017 |
| Bermuda | 999.2 | 1176 | −176.8 | 2017 | −2.9% | 128 | 2017 |
| Bolivia | 11796 | 14750 | −2954 | 2019 | −7.8% | 197 | 2017 |
| Brazil | 424196 | 617332 | −193136 | 2020 | −1.1% | 84 | 2017 |
| Barbados | 1271 | 1483 | −212 | 2020 | −4.0% | 156 | 2017 |
| Brunei | 1058 | 3189 | −2131 | 2020 | −17.3% | 218 | 2017 |
| Bhutan (Note: Bhutan: The Government of India finances nearly one-quarter of Bhutan's budget expenditures) | 710 | 777 | −67 | 2020 | −3.4% | 143 | 2017 |
| Botswana | 3828 | 6006 | −2178 | 2020 | −1.0% | 78 | 2017 |
| Central African Republic | 418 | 385 | 33 | 2019 | −0.9% | 72 | 2017 |
| Canada | 686718 | 861955 | −175237 | 2020 | −1.0% | 76 | 2017 |
| Switzerland (Note: Switzerland: Figures includes federal, cantonal, and municipal budgets) | 239767 | 230383 | 9384 | 2018 | 1.1% | 31 | 2017 |
| Chile | 55160 | 73176 | −18016 | 2020 | −2.8% | 124 | 2017 |
| China | 3983000 | 4893000 | −910000 | 2019 | −3.8% | 152 | 2017 |
| Ivory Coast | 8804 | 10145 | −1341 | 2019 | −4.2% | 158 | 2017 |
| Cameroon | 6118 | 7405 | −1287 | 2019 | −3.4% | 141 | 2017 |
| Democratic Republic of the Congo | 5419 | 6382 | −963 | 2019 | −0.9% | 73 | 2017 |
| Republic of the Congo | 3399 | 2628 | 771 | 2018 | −7.0% | 194 | 2017 |
| Cook Islands | 86.9 | 77.9 | 9.0 | 2010 | 3.0% | 13 | 2010 |
| Colombia | 94985 | 103098 | −8113 | 2019 | −2.7% | 117 | 2017 |
| Comoros | 223 | 228 | −5 | 2018 | −6.5% | 188 | 2017 |
| Cape Verde | 583 | 619 | −36 | 2019 | −3.0% | 131 | 2017 |
| Costa Rica | 9664 | 14001 | −4337 | 2019 | −6.1% | 185 | 2017 |
| Cuba | 54520 | 64640 | −10120 | 2017 | −10.8% | 214 | 2017 |
| Curaçao | | | | | −0.4% | 57 | 2012 |
| Cayman Islands | 874.5 | 766.6 | 107.9 | 2017 | 4.8% | 7 | 2017 |
| Cyprus (Note: Cyprus: Area administered by Turkish Cypriots - revenues: $2.5 billion; expenditures: $2.5 billion (est. 2006)) | 10362 | 9996 | 366 | 2019 | 1.8% | 17 | 2017 |
| Czech Republic | 103838 | 103167 | 671 | 2019 | 1.6% | 19 | 2017 |
| Germany | 1785000 | 1945000 | −160000 | 2020 | 1.3% | 26 | 2017 |
| Djibouti | 725 | 754 | −29 | 2019 | −9.0% | 205 | 2017 |
| Dominica | 180 | 184 | −4 | 2021 | −5.9% | 181 | 2017 |
| Denmark | 185645 | 172408 | 13237 | 2019 | 1.1% | 30 | 2017 |
| Dominican Republic | 12804 | 14511 | −1707 | 2019 | −3.0% | 130 | 2017 |
| Algeria | 55185 | 64728 | −9543 | 2019 | −9.6% | 207 | 2017 |
| Ecuador | 35914 | 39319 | −3405 | 2019 | −4.5% | 164 | 2017 |
| Egypt | 71160 | 100318 | −29158 | 2020 | −8.6% | 202 | 2017 |
| Eritrea | 633 | 549 | 84 | 2018 | −9.8% | 209 | 2017 |
| Spain | 546084 | 585979 | −39895 | 2019 | −3.1% | 134 | 2017 |
| Estonia | 12282 | 12269 | 13 | 2019 | −0.3% | 54 | 2017 |
| Ethiopia | 11308 | 13979 | −2671 | 2020 | −3.2% | 139 | 2017 |
| Finland (Note: Finland: Central Government Budget data; these numbers represent a significant reduction from previous official reporting) | 140643 | 153635 | −12992 | 2020 | −0.6% | 65 | 2017 |
| Fiji | 885 | 1515 | −630 | 2020 | −4.0% | 154 | 2017 |
| Falkland Islands | 67.1 | 75.3 | −8.2 | FY09/10 | −4.0% | 155 | FY09/10 |
| France | 1427000 | 1509000 | −82000 | 2019 | −2.6% | 116 | 2017 |
| Faroe Islands (Note: Faroe Islands: Denmark supplies the Faroe Islands with almost one-third of its public funds) | 835.6 | 883.8 | −48.2 | 2014 | −1.7% | 95 | 2014 |
| Federated States of Micronesia | 320 | 223 | 97 | 2018 | 6.6% | 4 | FY12/13 |
| Gabon | 3296 | 2937 | 359 | 2019 | −1.9% | 101 | 2017 |
| United Kingdom | 998006 | 1362000 | −363994 | 2020 | −1.9% | 100 | 2017 |
| Georgia | 4737 | 5059 | −322 | 2019 | −3.8% | 151 | 2017 |
| Guernsey | 563.6 | 30.9 | 532.7 | 2005 | 1.2% | 29 | 2005 |
| Ghana | 9492 | 14062 | −4570 | 2018 | −6.0% | 184 | 2017 |
| Gibraltar | 475.8 | 452.3 | 23.5 | 2008 | 1.1% | 33 | 2008 |
| Guinea | 1949 | 2014 | −65 | 2019 | −0.5% | 62 | 2017 |
| Gambia | 252 | 353 | −101 | 2018 | −2.6% | 115 | 2017 |
| Guinea-Bissau | 222 | 278 | −56 | 2019 | −1.3% | 87 | 2017 |
| Equatorial Guinea | 2604 | 2535 | 69 | 2018 | −3.3% | 140 | 2017 |
| Greece | 98523 | 97277 | 1246 | 2019 | 0.8% | 35 | 2017 |
| Grenada | 323 | 263 | 60 | 2019 | 3.2% | 12 | 2017 |
| Greenland | 1719 | 1594 | 125 | 2016 | 5.6% | 5 | 2016 |
| Guatemala | 8647 | 10373 | −1726 | 2019 | −1.3% | 86 | 2017 |
| Guam | 1240 | 1299 | −59 | 2016 | −1.0% | 75 | 2016 |
| Guyana | 1333 | 1467 | −134 | 2019 | −4.5% | 163 | 2017 |
| Hong Kong | 70124 | 105849 | −35725 | 2020 | 5.2% | 6 | 2017 |
| Honduras | 6476 | 6454 | 22 | 2019 | −2.7% | 120 | 2017 |
| Croatia | 212810 | 211069 | 1741 | 2019 | 0.8% | 36 | 2017 |
| Haiti | 1179 | 1527 | −348 | 2020 | −1.0% | 80 | 2017 |
| Hungary | 70830 | 74127 | −3297 | 2019 | −2.0% | 103 | 2017 |
| Indonesia | 130872 | 192970 | −62098 | 2020 | −2.7% | 122 | 2017 |
| Isle of Man | 965 | 943 | 22 | FY05/06 | 0.3% | 42 | FY05/06 |
| India | 495007 | 818940 | −323933 | 2020 | −3.5% | 145 | 2017 |
| Ireland | 99784 | 97713 | 2071 | 2019 | −0.3% | 55 | 2017 |
| Iran | 60714 | 90238 | −29524 | 2019 | −2.3% | 109 | 2017 |
| Iraq | 51534 | 85546 | −34012 | 2020 | −4.2% | 159 | 2017 |
| Iceland | 11776 | 11536 | 240 | 2018 | 1.5% | 23 | 2017 |
| Israel | 139374 | 154927 | −15553 | 2019 | −2.0% | 104 | 2017 |
| Italy | 901494 | 1080000 | −178506 | 2020 | −2.3% | 110 | 2017 |
| Jamaica | 4029 | 4564 | −535 | 2020 | 0.5% | 37 | 2017 |
| Jersey | 829 | 851 | −22 | 2005 | −0.4% | 56 | 2005 |
| Jordan | 10813 | 13489 | −2676 | 2019 | −5.1% | 169 | 2017 |
| Japan | 1765000 | 1916000 | −151000 | 2019 | −3.5% | 148 | 2017 |
| Kazakhstan | 29955 | 41994 | −12039 | 2020 | −1.8% | 98 | 2017 |
| Kenya | 16885 | 24271 | −7386 | 2019 | −6.7% | 190 | 2017 |
| Kyrgyzstan | 2878 | 2890 | −12 | 2019 | −3.2% | 138 | 2017 |
| Cambodia | 7254 | 6452 | 802 | 2019 | −1.8% | 97 | 2017 |
| Kiribati | 281 | 205 | 76 | 2017 | −64.1% | 221 | 2017 |
| Saint Kitts and Nevis | 286 | 324 | −38 | 2020 | 1.7% | 18 | 2017 |
| South Korea | 378552 | 372412 | 6140 | 2019 | 1.4% | 24 | 2017 |
| Kuwait | 77988 | 72030 | 5958 | 2019 | −10.0% | 210 | 2017 |
| Laos | 2896 | 3839 | −943 | 2019 | −5.5% | 173 | 2017 |
| Lebanon | 11061 | 16574 | −5513 | 2019 | −6.9% | 193 | 2017 |
| Liberia | 5 | 6 | −1 | 2019 | −4.3% | 161 | 2017 |
| Libya | 28005 | 37475 | −9470 | 2019 | −25.1% | 219 | 2017 |
| Saint Lucia | 350 | 516 | −166 | 2020 | 0.3% | 40 | 2017 |
| Liechtenstein | 995.3 | 890.4 | 104.9 | 2011 | 1.6% | 20 | 2012 |
| Sri Lanka | 10623 | 17496 | −6873 | 2019 | −5.5% | 174 | 2017 |
| Lesotho | 1054 | 1210 | −156 | 2020 | −6.0% | 182 | 2017 |
| Lithuania | 18636 | 18491 | 145 | 2019 | 0.5% | 38 | 2017 |
| Luxembourg | 31740 | 30014 | 1726 | 2019 | 1.5% | 22 | 2017 |
| Latvia | 12931 | 14242 | −1311 | 2020 | −0.5% | 61 | 2017 |
| Macau | 18119 | 10165 | 7954 | 2019 | 10.0% | 2 | 2017 |
| Morocco | 30697 | 35591 | −4894 | 2019 | −3.6% | 150 | 2017 |
| Monaco | 896.3 | 953.6 | −57.3 | 2011 | −1.0% | 81 | 2011 |
| Moldova (Note: Moldova: National Public Budget) | 3582 | 3754 | −172 | 2019 | −0.6% | 66 | 2017 |
| Madagascar | 1510 | 2090 | −580 | 2020 | −2.7% | 118 | 2017 |
| Maldives | 993 | 1797 | −804 | 2020 | −10.1% | 211 | 2016 |
| Mexico | 264261 | 313358 | −49097 | 2020 | −1.1% | 83 | 2017 |
| Marshall Islands | 148 | 153 | −5 | 2019 | 1.3% | 27 | 2013 |
| North Macedonia | 3505 | 4500 | −995 | 2020 | −2.7% | 119 | 2017 |
| Mali | 2657 | 3467 | −810 | 2018 | −2.9% | 126 | 2017 |
| Malta | 5661 | 5586 | 75 | 2019 | 3.9% | 9 | 2017 |
| Myanmar | 13361 | 18035 | −4674 | 2020 | −3.2% | 137 | 2017 |
| Montenegro | 2051 | 2568 | −517 | 2020 | −5.6% | 176 | 2017 |
| Mongolia | 3699 | 4979 | −1280 | 2020 | −6.4% | 187 | 2017 |
| Northern Mariana Islands | 389.6 | 344 | 46 | 2015 | 3.7% | 11 | 2016 |
| Mozambique | 4569 | 4591 | −22 | 2019 | −5.6% | 175 | 2017 |
| Mauritania | 1617 | 1407 | 210 | 2019 | −0.8% | 70 | 2017 |
| Montserrat | 66.67 | 47.04 | 19.63 | 2017 | | | |
| Mauritius | 2461 | 3675 | −1214 | 2020 | −0.3% | 53 | 2017 |
| Malawi | 1628 | 2129 | −501 | 2019 | −3.4% | 142 | 2017 |
| Malaysia | 77736 | 85851 | −8115 | 2019 | −3.0% | 132 | 2017 |
| Namibia | 4004 | 4693 | −689 | 2019 | −5.5% | 172 | 2017 |
| New Caledonia | 1995 | 1993 | 2 | 2015 | 0% | 47 | 2015 |
| Niger | 2325 | 2785 | −460 | 2019 | −5.0% | 168 | 2017 |
| Norfolk Island | 4.6 | 4.8 | −0.2 | FY99/00 | | | |
| Nigeria | 37298 | 59868 | −22570 | 2019 | −1.8% | 96 | 2017 |
| Nicaragua | 3452 | 3511 | −59 | 2019 | −2.0% | 102 | 2017 |
| Niue | 15.07 | 16.33 | −1.26 | FY04/05 | −12.6% | 215 | FY04/05 |
| Netherlands | 396687 | 374166 | 22521 | 2019 | 1.1% | 32 | 2017 |
| Norway | 185338 | 210522 | −25184 | 2020 | 4.4% | 8 | 2017 |
| Nepal | 7305 | 9008 | −1703 | 2020 | −0.1% | 49 | 2017 |
| Nauru | 195 | 158 | 37 | 2020 | −9.2% | 206 | 2017 |
| New Zealand | 76694 | 88593 | −11899 | 2020 | 1.6% | 21 | 2017 |
| Oman | 29334 | 35984 | −6650 | 2018 | −13.8% | 216 | 2017 |
| Pakistan (Note: Pakistan: Data are for fiscal years) | 38966 | 59621 | −20655 | 2020 | −5.8% | 180 | 2017 |
| Panama | 9743 | 15145 | −5402 | 2020 | −1.6% | 92 | 2017 |
| Pitcairn Islands | 746 | 1028 | −282 | FY04/05 | | | |
| Peru | 45983 | 49134 | −3151 | 2019 | −3.1% | 135 | 2017 |
| Philippines | 71173 | 90953 | −19780 | 2020 | −2.2% | 108 | 2017 |
| Palau | 122 | 121 | 1 | 2019 | 8.8% | 3 | 2016 |
| Papua New Guinea | 4039 | 5135 | −1096 | 2019 | −4.8% | 166 | 2017 |
| Poland | 244485 | 248868 | −4383 | 2019 | −1.7% | 94 | 2017 |
| Puerto Rico | 9268 | 9974 | −706 | 2017 | −0.7% | 67 | 2017 |
| North Korea | 3200 | 3300 | −100 | 2007 | −0.4% | 58 | 2007 |
| Portugal | 102052 | 101854 | 198 | 2019 | −3.0% | 133 | 2017 |
| Paraguay | 7272 | 8714 | −1442 | 2019 | −1.1% | 82 | 2017 |
| French Polynesia | 1891 | 1833 | 58 | 2011 | 1.2% | 28 | 2012 |
| Qatar | 65922 | 57258 | 8664 | 2019 | −5.8% | 178 | 2017 |
| Romania | 72193 | 83590 | −11397 | 2019 | −2.8% | 125 | 2017 |
| Russia | 604135 | 571465 | 32670 | 2019 | 1.4% | 88 | 2017 |
| Rwanda | 2393 | 2919 | −526 | 2019 | −4.3% | 160 | 2017 |
| Saudi Arabia | 247093 | 282400 | −35307 | 2019 | −8.9% | 204 | 2017 |
| Sudan | 3479 | 8277 | −4798 | 2019 | −10.6% | 213 | 2017 |
| Senegal | 4760 | 5662 | −902 | 2019 | −3.6% | 149 | 2017 |
| Singapore (Note: Singapore: Expenditures include both operational and development expenditures) | 59974 | 90264 | −30290 | 2020 | −0.3% | 52 | 2017 |
| Saint Helena, Ascension and Tristan da Cunha (Note: Saint Helena, Ascension and Tristan da Cunha: Revenue data reflect only locally raised revenues; the budget deficit is resolved by grant aid from the UK) | 8.4 | 20.7 | −12.3 | FY06/07 | | | |
| Solomon Islands | 514 | 537 | −23 | 2019 | −2.9% | 127 | 2017 |
| Sierra Leone | 740 | 867 | −127 | 2019 | −7.9% | 199 | 2017 |
| El Salvador | 6448 | 7273 | −825 | 2019 | −2.5% | 113 | 2017 |
| San Marino | 371 | 363 | 8 | 2019 | −2.9% | 129 | 2011 |
| Somalia | 145.3 | 151.1 | −5.8 | 2014 | −0.1% | 50 | 2014 |
| Saint Pierre and Miquelon | 70 | 60 | 10 | 1996 | 3.8% | 10 | 1996 |
| Serbia (Note: Serbia: Data include both central government and local government budgets) | 21858 | 25720 | −3862 | 2020 | 0.2% | 43 | 2017 |
| South Sudan | 1940 | 1938 | 2 | 2019 | −1.3% | 85 | FY2017/18 |
| São Tomé and Príncipe | 95 | 102 | −7 | 2019 | −2.4% | 111 | 2017 |
| Suriname | 863 | 1648 | −785 | 2019 | −7.8% | 196 | 2017 |
| Slovakia | 43495 | 44914 | −1419 | 2019 | −1.0% | 74 | 2017 |
| Slovenia | 23735 | 23456 | 279 | 2019 | 0% | 45 | 2017 |
| Sweden | 259170 | 256454 | 2716 | 2019 | 1.3% | 25 | 2017 |
| Eswatini | 1131 | 1454 | −323 | 2020 | −8.5% | 201 | 2017 |
| Seychelles | 601 | 586 | 15 | 2019 | −0.5% | 63 | 2017 |
| Syria (Note: Syria: Government projections for FY2016) | 1162 | 3211 | −2049 | 2017 | −8.7% | 203 | 2017 |
| Turks and Caicos Islands | 247.3 | 224.3 | 23.0 | 2017 | | | |
| Chad | 2290 | 2120 | 170 | 2020 | −1.5% | 91 | 2017 |
| Togo | 1275 | 1158 | 117 | 2019 | −3.8% | 153 | 2017 |
| Thailand | 104689 | 128581 | −23892 | 2020 | −3.5% | 147 | 2017 |
| Tajikistan | 2222 | 2393 | −171 | 2019 | −1.5% | 90 | 2017 |
| Tokelau | 24.32 | 11.67 | 12.65 | 2017 | | | |
| Turkmenistan | 5954 | 6134 | −180 | 2019 | −2.8% | 123 | 2017 |
| Timor-Leste | 879 | 1396 | −517 | 2019 | −75.7% | 222 | 2017 |
| Tonga | 212 | 196 | 16 | 2019 | 0% | 44 | 2017 |
| Trinidad and Tobago | 4939 | 7528 | −2589 | 2020 | −8.2% | 200 | 2017 |
| Tunisia | 10866 | 12375 | −1509 | 2019 | −5.8% | 179 | 2017 |
| Turkey | 210536 | 249268 | −38732 | 2020 | −1.5% | 89 | 2017 |
| Tuvalu (Note: Tuvalu: Revenue data include Official Development Assistance from Australia) | 87 | 88 | −1 | 2019 | 25.6% | 1 | 2013 |
| Taiwan | 94943 | 105833 | −10890 | 2019 | −0.1% | 48 | 2017 |
| Tanzania | 8968 | 10017 | −1049 | 2019 | −1.8% | 99 | 2017 |
| Uganda | 5088 | 6896 | −1808 | 2019 | −4.1% | 157 | 2017 |
| Ukraine | 29000 | 35750 | −6750 | 2021 | −5.5% | 171 | 2021 |
| Uruguay | 14991 | 17571 | −2580 | 2020 | −3.5% | 146 | 2017 |
| United States | 6429000 | 7647000 | −1218000 | 2019 | −3.4% | 144 | 2017 |
| Uzbekistan | 16197 | 16346 | −149 | 2019 | 0.3% | 41 | 2017 |
| Vatican City | 315 | 348 | −33 | 2013 | | | |
| Saint Vincent and the Grenadines | 243 | 288 | −45 | 2020 | −0.6% | 64 | 2017 |
| Venezuela | 30 | 76 | −46 | 2017 | −46.1% | 220 | 2017 |
| British Virgin Islands | 400 | 400 | 0 | 2017 | 0.0% | 46 | 2017 |
| United States Virgin Islands | 1496 | 1518 | −22 | 2016 | −0.4% | 59 | 2016 |
| Vietnam | 64895 | 75834 | −10939 | 2019 | −6.7% | 191 | 2017 |
| Vanuatu | 398 | 355 | 43 | 2019 | −0.9% | 71 | 2017 |
| (Palestine) West Bank and Gaza Strip | 3803 | 5002 | −1199 | 2020 | 0.4% | 39 | 2017 |
| Wallis and Futuna | 32.54 | 34.18 | −1.64 | 2015 | −0.8% | 69 | 2015 |
| Samoa | 313 | 263 | 50 | 2020 | −4.7% | 165 | 2017 |
| Kosovo | 1951 | 2547 | −596 | 2020 | −2.1% | 107 | 2017 |
| Yemen | 2207 | 3585 | −1378 | 2019 | −5.2% | 170 | 2017 |
| South Africa | 84190 | 121204 | −37014 | 2020 | −4.4% | 162 | 2017 |
| Zambia | 4758 | 7044 | −2286 | 2019 | −7.3% | 195 | 2017 |
| Zimbabwe | 17 | 23 | −6 | 2018 | −9.6% | 208 | 2017 |

== Purchasing Power Parity ==
The following is a list of countries by their partial forecasted estimated government budgets. The GDP dollar (INT$) data given on this page are derived from purchasing power parity (PPP) calculations. Comparisons using PPP are arguably more useful than nominal when assessing a nation's domestic market because PPP takes into account the relative cost of local goods, services and inflation rates of the country, rather than using international market exchange rates which may distort the real differences in per capita income. PPP is often used to gauge global poverty thresholds and is used by the United Nations in constructing the human development index. It is however limited when measuring financial flows between countries. These surveys such as the International Comparison Program include both tradable and non-tradable goods in an attempt to estimate a representative basket of all goods.

For some countries like Brazil, only the federal budget is shown. For most other countries, the total budget is shown. Although Germany is a country, the statistics for Germany represent total general government spending. Similar to Germany, Russia has a federative structure and a three layer budget system, here the total government spending is shown. Data are in millions of international dollars. Only sovereign states with over 500 billion in budget are included.

| Country | Budget (PPP) | GDP (PPP) | Government Expenditure (% of GDP) |
|---|---|---|---|
| United States | 9,818,534 | 20,807,269 | 47.2 |
| China | 8,761,782 | 24,162,435 | 36.2 |
| India | 2,704,833 | 8,681,303 | 31.2 |
| Japan | 2,519,315 | 5,236,138 | 48.1 |
| Germany | 2,401,598 | 4,454,498 | 53.9 |
| France | 1,863,802 | 2,954,196 | 63.1 |
| United Kingdom | 1,581,438 | 2,978,564 | 53.1 |
| Russia | 1,499,905 | 4,021,733 | 37.3 |
| Italy | 1,442,434 | 2,415,410 | 59.4 |
| Brazil | 1,380,117 | 3,078,901 | 44.8 |
| Canada | 1,036,915 | 1,808,995 | 57.3 |
| Spain | 935,041 | 1,773,364 | 52.7 |
| Turkey | 877,998 | 2,381,594 | 36.8 |
| Mexico | 733,147 | 2,424,511 | 30.2 |
| Saudi Arabia | 626,022 | 1,608,610 | 38.9 |
| Indonesia | 603,152 | 3,328,288 | 18.1 |
| South Korea | 599,032 | 2,293,475 | 26.1 |
| Australia | 581,944 | 1,307,916 | 44.5 |

== See also ==
- List of countries by government budget per capita
- List of countries by tax revenue
- List of countries by historical government spending
- List of countries by government debt

Europe:

- List of sovereign states in Europe by budget revenues
- List of sovereign states in Europe by budget revenues per capita

United States:

- List of U.S. state budgets
