= List of countries by government budget per capita =

This is the list of countries by government budget per capita. The list includes sovereign states and self-governing dependent territories based upon the ISO standard ISO 3166-1. The following tables show the governmental budget of each country/territory/group divided by its total population, not adjusted to purchasing power parity, in current US dollars, based on data published by International Monetary Fund, and World Bank.

According to International Monetary Fund, "revenue consists of taxes, social contributions, grants receivable, and other revenue. Revenue increases government's net worth, which is the difference between its assets and liabilities (GFSM 2001, paragraph 4.20). Transactions that merely change the composition of the balance sheet do not change the net worth position, for example, proceeds from sales of nonfinancial and financial assets or incurrence of liabilities. Expenditure-based GDP is total final expenditures at purchasers' prices (including the f.o.b. value of exports of goods and services), less the f.o.b. value of imports of goods and services. Total expenditure consists of total expense and the net acquisition of nonfinancial assets. Apart from being on an accrual basis, total expenditure differs from the GFSM 1986 definition of total expenditure in the sense that it also takes the disposals of nonfinancial assets into account. Values are based upon GDP in national currency converted to U.S. dollars using market exchange rates (yearly average). Exchange rate projections are provided by country economists for the group of other emerging market and developing countries. Exchanges rates for advanced economies are established in the WEO (World Economic Outlook) assumptions for each WEO exercise. For census purposes, the total population of a country consists of all persons falling within the scope of the census. In the broadest sense, the total may comprise either all usual residents of the country or all persons present in the country at the time of the census. [Principles and Recommendations for Population and Housing Censuses, Revision 1, paragraph 2.42]."

According to World Bank, "revenue is cash receipts from taxes, social contributions, and other revenues such as fines, fees, rent, and income from property or sales. Grants are also considered as revenue but are excluded here. Expense is cash payments for operating activities of the government in providing goods and services. It includes compensation of employees (such as wages and salaries), interest and subsidies, grants, social benefits, and other expenses such as rent and dividends. GDP at purchaser's prices is the sum of gross value added by all resident producers in the economy plus any product taxes and minus any subsidies not included in the value of the products. It is calculated without making deductions for depreciation of fabricated assets or for depletion and degradation of natural resources. Dollar figures for GDP are converted from domestic currencies using single year official exchange rates. For a few countries where the official exchange rate does not reflect the rate effectively applied to actual foreign exchange transactions, an alternative conversion factor is used. Total population is based on the de facto definition of population, which counts all residents regardless of legal status or citizenship. The values shown are midyear estimates."

== International Monetary Fund ==
In the following table, for each country/territory, IMF figures shows total population, GDP, government revenue,, government expenditure, and government expenditure per capita, in current USD, calculated on an exchange rate basis, i.e., not in purchasing power parity (PPP) terms. Sorting is alphabetical by country code, according to ISO 3166-1 alpha-3.

Government budget per capita (USD, current prices)
Country/Territory Region/Group	Population	GDP	Revenue		Revenue per capita	Expenditure		Expenditure per capita	Year
Country/Territory Region/Group	thousands	million USD	% of GDP	million USD	USD	% of GDP	million USD	USD	Year
Aruba	109	3126	19.74%	616.98	5660.35	29.37%	918.07	8422.71	2021
Afghanistan	32941	20136	25.69%	5173.74	157.06	27.94%	5625.39	170.77	2020
Angola	34504	74791	23.33%	17447.99	505.68	19.50%	14580.51	422.57	2021
Albania	2873	18310	27.04%	4950.47	1723.10	31.39%	5747.51	2000.53	2021
Andorra	80	3330	36.85%	1227.07	15338.40	39.15%	1303.70	16296.19	2021
United Arab Emirates	9558	415022	30.43%	126307.80	13214.88	26.40%	109565.81	11463.26	2021
Argentina	45842	486702	33.51%	163069.51	3557.21	37.83%	184129.10	4016.60	2021
Armenia	2962	13861	24.11%	3342.30	1128.39	28.70%	3978.52	1343.19	2021
Antigua and Barbuda	99	1471	20.55%	302.23	3052.85	26.76%	393.65	3976.31	2021
Australia	25973	1701893	35.13%	597857.99	23018.44	42.19%	718011.64	27644.54	2022
Austria	9025	471685	49.08%	231507.71	25651.82	55.96%	263931.34	29244.47	2022
Azerbaijan	10119	54622	36.50%	19938.12	1970.36	29.46%	16093.83	1590.46	2021
Burundi	11529	3012	22.38%	673.97	58.46	29.44%	886.85	76.92	2019
Belgium	11618	582210	49.35%	287320.64	24730.65	55.49%	323079.97	27808.57	2022
Benin	13041	17699	14.15%	2503.70	191.99	19.86%	3514.14	269.47	2021
Burkina Faso	22145	19748	20.32%	4012.40	181.19	27.75%	5480.66	247.49	2021
Bangladesh	168520	460201	8.74%	40212.36	238.62	12.97%	59674.26	354.11	2022
Bulgaria	6798	89115	37.43%	33353.96	4906.44	38.60%	34395.72	5059.68	2022
Bahrain	1504	39303	20.84%	8190.75	5445.97	32.40%	12733.78	8466.61	2021
Bahamas	389	11209	19.40%	2173.99	5588.65	27.06%	3033.60	7798.47	2021
Bosnia and Herzegovina	3481	23650	40.52%	9582.27	2752.73	39.78%	9407.73	2702.60	2021
Belarus	9303	73120	31.96%	23369.88	2512.08	36.82%	26924.25	2894.15	2022
Belize	430	2492	21.87%	545.10	1267.67	25.08%	625.02	1453.53	2021
Bolivia	11800	40703	25.07%	10204.24	864.77	36.31%	14778.85	1252.45	2021
Brazil	213911	1924134	38.75%	745544.20	3485.30	43.32%	833573.33	3896.82	2022
Barbados	289	4868	28.93%	1408.07	4872.21	31.24%	1520.86	5262.49	2021
Brunei	441	14010	21.12%	2958.63	6708.92	29.14%	4081.95	9256.13	2021
Bhutan	753	2442	33.16%	809.72	1075.32	34.84%	850.67	1129.71	2021
Botswana	2594	18768	29.55%	5545.38	2137.77	31.84%	5976.11	2303.82	2021
Central African Republic	4920	2585	13.66%	353.21	71.79	19.68%	508.75	103.41	2021
Canada	38846	2139840	40.78%	872541.16	22461.54	41.48%	887520.04	22847.14	2022
Switzerland	8739	807234	33.82%	272974.25	31236.33	35.22%	284340.10	32536.92	2022
Chile	19923	300729	27.89%	83876.33	4210.02	26.56%	79864.60	4008.66	2022
China	1412547	18100044	25.54%	4622208.24	3272.25	33.08%	5987675.56	4238.92	2022
Ivory Coast	26958	62954	14.59%	9184.99	340.71	21.45%	13501.11	500.82	2020
Cameroon	27224	45391	13.96%	6334.77	232.69	16.94%	7689.24	282.44	2021
Democratic Republic of the Congo	90794	48707	8.95%	4359.76	48.02	10.37%	5052.86	55.65	2020
Republic of the Congo	4682	10502	21.88%	2297.42	490.69	23.10%	2426.28	518.21	2020
Colombia	51609	343939	27.56%	94796.47	1836.82	34.44%	118459.47	2295.33	2022
Comoros	921	1285	17.04%	218.99	237.77	19.83%	254.76	276.62	2021
Cape Verde	563	2112	22.63%	477.88	848.81	29.93%	632.08	1122.70	2021
Costa Rica	5229	68385	16.59%	11343.02	2169.25	19.35%	13231.81	2530.47	2022
Cyprus	905	28467	42.12%	11989.73	13248.32	39.86%	11346.66	12537.75	2022
Czech Republic	10702	281791	41.41%	116700.92	10904.59	46.51%	131072.27	12247.46	2021
Germany	83794	4075395	47.08%	1918858.98	22899.72	49.70%	2025634.33	24173.98	2022
Djibouti	988	3181	23.45%	745.98	755.04	23.00%	731.57	740.45	2020
Dominica	73	504	60.13%	303.04	4151.23	50.47%	254.35	3484.23	2020
Denmark	5873	390677	51.67%	201851.09	34369.33	50.80%	198479.54	33795.26	2022
Dominican Republic	10540	94458	15.60%	14734.50	1397.96	18.53%	17502.12	1660.54	2021
Algeria	44577	163138	29.83%	48667.33	1091.76	37.03%	60411.63	1355.22	2021
Ecuador	17757	106166	34.16%	36262.06	2042.13	35.76%	37968.15	2138.21	2021
Egypt	104142	475231	18.92%	89923.21	863.47	24.70%	117386.81	1127.18	2022
Eritrea	3497	1982	33.97%	673.34	192.55	35.46%	702.86	200.99	2019
Spain	47603	1400520	43.36%	607195.45	12755.40	50.62%	708901.21	14891.94	2022
Estonia	1332	38131	39.03%	14883.29	11173.64	40.19%	15323.32	11504.00	2022
Ethiopia	101900	99269	11.03%	10950.36	107.46	13.80%	13697.14	134.42	2021
Finland	5548	281047	52.19%	146667.19	26436.05	55.70%	156537.56	28215.13	2022
Fiji	905	4296	20.62%	885.96	978.97	34.13%	1466.10	1620.00	2021
France	65450	2957423	52.55%	1554096.21	23744.79	59.08%	1747245.51	26695.88	2021
Federated States of Micronesia	104	402	79.71%	320.43	3081.10	55.49%	223.05	2144.71	2018
Gabon	2135	20242	14.73%	2981.85	1396.65	16.58%	3356.73	1572.24	2021
United Kingdom	67791	3070600	38.88%	1193972.10	17612.55	45.14%	1386191.66	20448.02	2022
Georgia	3729	18625	25.52%	4753.10	1274.63	31.56%	5878.80	1576.51	2021
Ghana	31394	79157	15.27%	12084.90	384.94	27.36%	21660.52	689.96	2021
Guinea	13967	14178	13.91%	1971.73	141.17	15.32%	2172.49	155.54	2020
Gambia	2492	2034	16.82%	342.06	137.26	21.65%	440.34	176.70	2021
Guinea-Bissau	1855	1725	19.09%	329.23	177.48	24.71%	426.16	229.74	2021
Equatorial Guinea	1452	12269	15.30%	1877.16	1292.81	12.66%	1553.13	1069.65	2021
Greece	10635	219237	51.53%	112972.83	10622.74	57.45%	125947.27	11842.71	2022
Grenada	113	1105	32.07%	354.37	3136.05	26.93%	297.60	2633.62	2021
Guatemala	18340	86988	12.21%	10624.71	579.32	13.39%	11643.34	634.86	2021
Guyana	789	7658	18.74%	1434.73	1818.41	26.01%	1991.46	2524.03	2021
Hong Kong	7402	368924	23.72%	87497.71	11820.82	23.71%	87468.19	11816.83	2021
Honduras	10117	28291	25.29%	7153.38	707.07	28.42%	8041.43	794.84	2021
Croatia	3879	68891	45.95%	31657.48	8161.25	48.54%	33439.00	8620.52	2021
Haiti	11906	21017	8.23%	1729.70	145.28	10.17%	2136.38	179.44	2021
Hungary	9731	181848	41.28%	75057.76	7713.26	48.42%	88047.16	9048.11	2021
Indonesia	274859	1318807	15.20%	200445.48	729.27	17.54%	231318.75	841.59	2022
India	1423331	3386403	19.20%	650223.24	456.83	29.33%	993062.68	697.70	2022
Ireland	5134	529661	23.31%	123474.57	24050.36	24.82%	131477.75	25609.22	2022
Iran	85690	352213	8.27%	29113.93	339.76	12.21%	43001.69	501.83	2022
Iraq	41176	206517	36.69%	75764.89	1840.03	37.06%	76539.33	1858.83	2021
Iceland	369	25553	41.37%	10572.30	28651.21	49.76%	12715.43	34459.16	2021
Israel	9367	488527	36.57%	178659.21	19073.26	44.74%	218542.55	23331.11	2021
Italy	58980	2012013	48.79%	981620.90	16643.28	56.83%	1143326.39	19384.98	2022
Jamaica	2740	14674	31.02%	4551.29	1661.05	29.08%	4267.64	1557.53	2021
Jordan	10269	45809	25.03%	11464.16	1116.39	32.80%	15024.44	1463.09	2021
Japan	125171	4233538	36.19%	1532202.07	12240.87	42.76%	1810133.84	14461.29	2022
Kazakhstan	19503	197112	17.10%	33714.04	1728.66	21.69%	42759.51	2192.46	2021
Kenya	49801	110347	16.72%	18451.12	370.50	23.49%	25919.41	520.46	2021
Kyrgyzstan	6654	8747	33.20%	2903.57	436.36	33.95%	2969.34	446.25	2021
Cambodia	15835	26601	21.58%	5739.17	362.44	28.64%	7618.53	481.12	2021
Kiribati	121	228	100.35%	228.80	1890.89	111.55%	254.34	2101.95	2021
Saint Kitts and Nevis	58	861	50.41%	434.00	7482.68	44.80%	385.71	6650.19	2021
South Korea	51745	1810966	25.83%	467681.97	9038.21	25.85%	468044.16	9045.21	2021
Kuwait	4671	105949	55.12%	58399.09	12502.48	52.29%	55404.97	11861.48	2020
Laos	7319	18511	12.99%	2404.58	328.54	16.33%	3021.92	412.89	2020
Lebanon	6825	24494	16.03%	3925.90	575.22	19.55%	4789.07	701.69	2020
Liberia	5180	3509	27.28%	957.40	184.83	29.70%	1042.10	201.18	2021
Libya	6710	39007	59.98%	23396.79	3486.85	60.36%	23545.02	3508.94	2021
Saint Lucia	182	1691	23.35%	394.81	2169.31	26.08%	440.96	2422.87	2021
Sri Lanka	22156	88979	8.28%	7364.79	332.41	19.91%	17718.39	799.71	2021
Lesotho	2087	2550	48.48%	1236.11	592.29	47.84%	1219.79	584.47	2021
Lithuania	2817	70523	35.75%	25212.68	8950.19	36.59%	25805.07	9160.48	2022
Luxembourg	645	82340	43.09%	35477.01	55003.12	42.89%	35313.98	54750.36	2022
Latvia	1889	42225	35.63%	15042.66	7963.29	39.25%	16571.62	8772.70	2022
Macau	697	21979	25.00%	5495.63	7884.69	41.72%	9168.54	13154.29	2022
Morocco	36313	142867	25.11%	35871.05	987.83	31.05%	44360.20	1221.61	2021
Moldova	2541	14410	33.52%	4830.23	1900.92	36.78%	5299.71	2085.68	2022
Madagascar	28961	15233	13.57%	2067.12	71.38	20.33%	3097.48	106.95	2022
Maldives	384	5386	25.73%	1385.66	3608.48	49.95%	2690.09	7005.45	2021
Mexico	130118	1414101	25.80%	364781.49	2803.47	30.23%	427426.17	3284.91	2022
Marshall Islands	55	244	69.63%	169.90	3089.17	67.12%	163.76	2977.47	2020
North Macedonia	2069	13835	30.33%	4196.29	2028.17	35.71%	4941.03	2388.13	2021
Mali	21230	17643	20.52%	3619.64	170.50	26.45%	4665.87	219.78	2020
Malta	521	17779	35.64%	6337.15	12163.43	43.61%	7753.60	14882.15	2022
Myanmar	53199	81257	16.04%	13032.00	244.97	21.65%	17590.52	330.66	2020
Montenegro	622	5865	43.12%	2529.05	4065.99	42.67%	2502.60	4023.47	2021
Mongolia	3410	15286	32.85%	5020.84	1472.39	34.38%	5255.79	1541.29	2021
Mozambique	32077	15777	27.89%	4400.05	137.17	31.53%	4974.17	155.07	2021
Mauritania	4240	9892	21.97%	2173.17	512.54	19.17%	1896.49	447.29	2021
Mauritius	1262	12772	23.85%	3045.99	2413.62	28.06%	3584.33	2840.20	2022
Malawi	21474	12463	15.06%	1876.55	87.39	23.67%	2950.37	137.39	2021
Malaysia	32580	373034	18.61%	69421.63	2130.81	24.38%	90953.15	2791.69	2021
Namibia	2597	12345	30.06%	3710.29	1428.68	37.31%	4606.17	1773.65	2022
Niger	25131	14923	18.36%	2739.12	108.99	24.26%	3620.32	144.06	2021
Nigeria	216747	477376	8.79%	41956.58	193.57	14.27%	68121.56	314.29	2022
Nicaragua	6539	14001	29.35%	4109.01	628.39	30.57%	4279.41	654.44	2021
Netherlands	17591	993681	43.52%	432430.10	24582.46	45.81%	455245.01	25879.43	2022
Norway	5448	579267	60.92%	352889.46	64774.13	47.57%	275551.52	50578.47	2022
Nepal	29748	36289	23.68%	8592.51	288.84	27.73%	10062.21	338.25	2021
Nauru	12	125	140.98%	176.22	14684.90	123.92%	154.90	12908.02	2019
New Zealand	5111	249312	38.45%	95867.94	18757.18	42.14%	105047.61	20553.24	2021
Oman	4527	88192	33.00%	29102.48	6428.65	29.05%	25615.37	5658.35	2021
Pakistan	222590	348227	12.43%	43270.69	194.40	18.47%	64324.49	288.98	2021
Panama	4337	63605	18.17%	11555.12	2664.31	24.83%	15792.49	3641.34	2021
Peru	33829	225937	21.00%	47453.55	1402.75	23.09%	52173.37	1542.27	2021
Philippines	111570	404261	21.58%	87231.44	781.85	26.81%	108398.54	971.57	2022
Palau	18	225	50.08%	112.69	6260.38	66.37%	149.34	8296.75	2021
Papua New Guinea	8781	23848	14.66%	3495.16	398.04	23.51%	5606.19	638.45	2020
Poland	37654	688301	41.00%	282196.53	7494.46	44.14%	303802.30	8068.26	2022
Puerto Rico	3200	106526	20.95%	22316.13	6973.79	21.39%	22780.59	7118.93	2021
Portugal	10292	252381	43.75%	110416.69	10728.40	45.70%	115328.02	11205.60	2022
Paraguay	7353	39951	18.74%	7486.42	1018.14	24.80%	9907.45	1347.40	2021
Qatar	2618	179677	33.68%	60513.42	23114.37	29.33%	52692.08	20126.84	2021
Romania	19042	301845	30.99%	93526.67	4911.60	36.75%	110931.06	5825.60	2022
Russia	145558	1836631	35.57%	653216.18	4487.67	34.79%	639019.02	4390.13	2021
Rwanda	12957	11067	24.56%	2718.17	209.78	31.56%	3492.75	269.56	2021
Saudi Arabia	34793	1108149	30.57%	338761.15	9736.47	31.90%	353466.29	10159.12	2022
Sudan	43222	33564	7.85%	2633.10	60.92	9.76%	3275.51	75.78	2019
Senegal	17204	27640	19.44%	5373.77	312.36	25.74%	7115.64	413.60	2021
Singapore	5637	466789	15.85%	74000.06	13127.56	15.41%	71941.52	12762.38	2022
Solomon Islands	687	1536	30.99%	476.02	692.90	31.55%	484.59	705.38	2020
Sierra Leone	8141	4148	20.94%	868.51	106.68	30.22%	1253.57	153.98	2021
El Salvador	6314	28737	26.43%	7594.61	1202.82	32.02%	9200.44	1457.15	2021
San Marino	34	1543	21.59%	333.07	9796.23	39.36%	607.26	17860.68	2020
Somalia	15189	7628	4.94%	376.52	24.79	8.82%	672.79	44.29	2021
Serbia	6872	63082	43.25%	27284.23	3970.35	46.56%	29371.61	4274.10	2021
South Sudan	12976	3118	47.65%	1485.60	114.49	47.93%	1494.33	115.16	2018
São Tomé and Príncipe	218	477	29.04%	138.51	635.37	23.12%	110.26	505.80	2020
Suriname	603	2884	18.42%	531.32	881.13	33.24%	958.70	1589.88	2020
Slovakia	5435	113529	40.74%	46246.04	8508.93	46.34%	52610.47	9679.94	2022
Slovenia	2107	62167	43.09%	26785.27	12712.52	49.29%	30643.98	14543.89	2022
Sweden	10522	585939	47.46%	278104.23	26430.74	48.37%	283436.27	26937.49	2022
Eswatini	1139	4744	25.39%	1204.41	1057.42	30.04%	1424.91	1251.02	2021
Seychelles	98	1457	34.00%	495.35	5054.60	39.53%	575.98	5877.36	2021
Syria	21393	60043	20.85%	12517.76	585.13	26.74%	16056.70	750.56	2010
Chad	16915	11800	16.81%	1984.05	117.30	18.42%	2173.68	128.51	2021
Togo	8658	8430	16.95%	1428.63	165.01	21.55%	1816.58	209.82	2021
Thailand	69951	505523	20.23%	102282.47	1462.20	27.26%	137825.79	1970.32	2021
Tajikistan	9836	10467	27.52%	2880.52	292.85	27.64%	2893.29	294.15	2022
Turkmenistan	6152	64367	10.72%	6898.21	1121.30	10.28%	6618.21	1075.78	2021
Timor-Leste	1344	3621	25.34%	917.63	682.76	68.80%	2491.21	1853.58	2021
Tonga	100	470	48.33%	227.15	2271.46	49.29%	231.65	2316.54	2021
Trinidad and Tobago	1407	24460	22.79%	5575.41	3962.62	28.96%	7084.11	5034.90	2021
Tunisia	12019	46688	25.68%	11987.14	997.35	34.92%	16303.92	1356.51	2021
Turkey	85280	905527	26.41%	239113.46	2803.86	28.04%	253927.88	2977.58	2022
Tuvalu	11	60	109.54%	65.72	5974.64	123.38%	74.03	6729.93	2021
Taiwan	23334	761691	15.58%	118648.61	5084.80	17.34%	132046.75	5658.98	2022
Tanzania	59730	69938	14.36%	10045.89	168.19	17.79%	12443.37	208.33	2021
Uganda	42460	42941	14.07%	6042.23	142.30	21.57%	9260.23	218.09	2021
Ukraine	40998	200155	36.32%	72688.29	1772.97	69.92%	139948.38	3413.54	2021
Uruguay	3543	59321	28.22%	16741.57	4725.25	29.47%	17479.53	4933.54	2021
United States	333530	25464475	32.99%	8401239.59	25188.86	43.02%	10954053.21	32842.78	2022
Kosovo	1769	9418	27.76%	2614.53	1477.97	29.04%	2734.52	1545.80	2021
Uzbekistan	34559	69601	25.93%	18048.93	522.26	30.49%	21217.86	613.96	2021
Saint Vincent and the Grenadines	111	872	30.53%	266.24	2398.55	35.18%	306.73	2763.30	2021
Venezuela	28903	102021	6.39%	6523.22	225.69	21.77%	22205.89	768.29	2018
Vietnam	99462	406452	18.27%	74246.59	746.48	21.88%	88911.38	893.92	2022
Vanuatu	292	930	42.63%	396.47	1357.77	43.38%	403.40	1381.50	2019
(Palestine) West Bank and Gaza Strip	5227	18109	25.20%	4563.29	873.02	28.51%	5162.33	987.63	2021
Samoa	201	832	38.51%	320.43	1594.17	33.14%	275.72	1371.77	2022
Yemen	31927	18373	6.81%	1250.28	39.16	11.71%	2152.03	67.40	2020
South Africa	60604	405705	27.70%	112380.29	1854.34	32.19%	130576.15	2154.58	2022
Zambia	19473	22148	22.32%	4942.77	253.83	30.43%	6740.30	346.14	2021
Zimbabwe	15492	35967	15.37%	5527.77	356.81	17.53%	6303.94	406.92	2021
Notes: IMF: Values are based upon GDP in national currency converted to U.S. dollars using market exchange rates (yearly average). Exchange rate projections are provided by country economists for the group of other emerging market and developing countries. Exchanges rates for advanced economies are established in the WEO assumptions for each WEO exercise. Expenditure-based GDP is total final expenditures at purchasers' prices (including the f.o.b. value of exports of goods and services), less the f.o.b. value of imports of goods and services. Revenue consists of taxes, social contributions, grants receivable, and other revenue. Revenue increases government's net worth, which is the difference between its assets and liabilities (GFSM 2001, paragraph 4.20). Note: Transactions that merely change the composition of the balance sheet do not change the net worth position, for example, proceeds from sales of nonfinancial and financial assets or incurrence of liabilities. Total expenditure consists of total expense and the net acquisition of nonfinancial assets. Note: Apart from being on an accrual basis, total expenditure differs from the GFSM 1986 definition of total expenditure in the sense that it also takes the disposals of nonfinancial assets into account. For census purposes, the total population of the country consists of all persons falling within the scope of the census. In the broadest sense, the total may comprise either all usual residents of the country or all persons present in the country at the time of the census. [Principles and Recommendations for Population and Housing Censuses, Revision 1, paragraph 2.42]

== World Bank ==
In the following table, for each country/territory, WB figures shows total population, GDP, government revenue, government expense, and government expense per capita, in current USD. Sorting is alphabetical by country code, according to ISO 3166-1 alpha-3.

Government budget per capita (USD, current prices)
Country/Territory Region/Group	Population	GDP	Revenue		Revenue per capita	Expense		Expense per capita	Year
Country/Territory Region/Group	thousands	million USD	% of GDP	million USD	USD	% of GDP	million USD	USD	Year
(United Nations) WORLD	8024997	105435039.51	24.68%	26023794.11	3242.84	29.34%	30931803.37	3854.43	2022
Afghanistan	42240	14502.16	13.04%	1890.97	44.77	39.22%	5687.76	134.65	2017
Angola	36684	84722.96	21.79%	18462.49	503.28	16.68%	14135.98	385.34	2019
Albania	2746	22977.68	25.19%	5787.77	2107.73	24.54%	5637.88	2053.15	2021
United Arab Emirates	9517	504173.45	3.24%	16336.45	1716.58	3.84%	19372.17	2035.56	2022
Argentina	46655	640591.41	17.97%	115141.75	2467.96	21.96%	140699.60	3015.77	2022
Armenia	2778	24212.13	23.46%	5679.31	2044.41	21.16%	5123.96	1844.50	2022
Australia	26639	1723827.22	26.17%	451169.96	16936.73	27.63%	476238.81	17877.81	2022
Austria	9132	516034.14	44.56%	229958.58	25180.57	47.89%	247113.56	27059.04	2022
Azerbaijan	10113	72356.18	36.52%	26423.73	2612.96	27.14%	19640.66	1942.21	2021
Burundi	13239	2642.16	17.55%	463.76	35.03	15.12%	399.60	30.18	2021
Belgium	11823	632216.58	37.76%	238739.47	20193.50	40.25%	254443.77	21521.83	2022
Benin	3732	1186.23	12.93%	153.39	41.10				1979
Burkina Faso	23251	20324.62	19.69%	4001.48	172.10	20.82%	4230.83	181.96	2022
Bangladesh	172954	437415.33	9.54%	41724.23	241.24	8.32%	36411.55	210.53	2021
Bulgaria	6430	101584.38	36.69%	37272.41	5796.31	39.48%	40108.99	6237.43	2022
Bahrain	1486	43205.00	16.00%	6911.23	4652.43	27.03%	11676.31	7860.14	2020
Bahamas	413	14338.50	19.83%	2843.92	6892.31	23.62%	3386.33	8206.84	2022
Bosnia and Herzegovina	3211	27054.89	35.87%	9705.79	3022.81	33.42%	9042.76	2816.32	2022
Belarus	9178	71857.38	26.07%	18735.07	2041.24	28.27%	20313.36	2213.19	2022
Belize	411	3281.50	23.80%	781.01	1901.08	22.34%	733.00	1784.23	2017
Bolivia	9711	13120.11	23.27%	3052.47	314.33	21.81%	2861.63	294.67	2007
Brazil	216422	2173665.66	29.62%	643753.61	2974.52	34.13%	741969.06	3428.34	2022
Barbados	279	4848.21	29.53%	1431.55	5137.46	33.70%	1633.73	5863.04	2016
Bhutan	787	2898.23	20.03%	580.47	737.18	24.08%	697.78	886.16	2020
Botswana	2675	19395.77	29.46%	5713.23	2135.51	25.09%	4866.67	1819.08	2022
Central African Republic	5742	2555.49	9.20%	235.23	40.96	11.66%	298.01	51.90	2021
Canada	40098	2140085.57	18.16%	388711.59	9694.10	18.50%	395841.69	9871.91	2022
Switzerland	8850	884940.40	17.39%	153926.11	17393.07	16.66%	147429.26	16658.95	2022
Chile	19630	335533.33	26.00%	87253.47	4445.00	24.05%	80711.05	4111.70	2022
China	1410710	17794781.99	15.01%	2671436.80	1893.68				
Ivory Coast	28873	78788.83	12.17%	9591.97	332.21	18.61%	14662.86	507.84	2022
Cameroon	28647	47945.51	13.75%	6591.77	230.10	12.43%	5958.62	208.00	2021
Democratic Republic of the Congo	102263	66383.29	14.16%	9402.97	91.95	13.32%	8844.21	86.49	2022
Republic of the Congo	6107	15321.06	20.05%	3072.09	503.05	16.13%	2471.61	404.73	2021
Colombia	52085	363540.16	24.77%	90047.57	1728.85	32.73%	118995.53	2284.63	2022
Cape Verde	599	2587.25	21.57%	557.99	932.04	30.88%	799.00	1334.59	2020
Costa Rica	5212	86497.94	29.15%	25213.77	4837.48	28.59%	24732.81	4745.20	2022
Cyprus	1260	32229.62	39.81%	12830.39	10181.73	36.80%	11861.08	9412.52	2022
Czech Republic	10874	330858.34	31.39%	103865.49	9552.00	35.78%	118374.62	10886.33	2022
Germany	84482	4456081.02	28.86%	1286015.37	15222.31	32.08%	1429519.24	16920.94	2022
Denmark	5947	404198.76	36.43%	147232.93	24757.71	32.68%	132102.40	22213.46	2022
Dominican Republic	11333	121444.28	16.08%	19532.62	1723.52	17.68%	21470.16	1894.49	2022
Ecuador	18190	118844.83	30.84%	36654.41	2015.03	30.32%	36031.79	1980.80	2022
Egypt	97724	329366.58	20.99%	69129.51	707.40	30.23%	99568.73	1018.88	2015
Spain	48373	1580694.71	30.41%	480694.84	9937.19	36.29%	573558.72	11856.92	2022
Estonia	1366	40744.85	35.03%	14273.71	10447.84	35.61%	14510.98	10621.51	2022
Ethiopia	126527	163697.93	5.06%	8276.11	65.41	7.42%	12150.40	96.03	2022
Finland	5584	300187.20	36.68%	110114.73	19718.75	37.96%	113936.50	20403.14	2022
Fiji	936	5494.80	19.01%	1044.73	1115.71	34.56%	1898.96	2027.99	2021
France	68170	3030904.09	43.56%	1320381.98	19368.89	49.00%	1485206.08	21786.73	2022
Federated States of Micronesia	115	460.00	29.78%	136.97	1188.73	23.48%	108.02	937.48	2020
Gabon	2437	20516.13	14.54%	2982.43	1224.03	13.51%	2772.69	1137.95	2021
United Kingdom	68350	3340032.38	36.77%	1228270.90	17970.31	41.79%	1395958.86	20423.68	2022
Georgia	3760	30535.53	26.49%	8088.60	2151.02	24.94%	7614.48	2024.93	2022
Ghana	34122	76370.39	15.55%	11876.02	348.05	22.68%	17320.04	507.59	2022
Guinea	6832	4789.22	8.26%	395.80	57.93	6.47%	309.84	45.35	1992
Gambia	1041	317.08	19.44%	61.65	59.25	17.16%	54.41	52.29	1990
Guinea-Bissau	2151	1966.46	12.00%	236.05	109.75	14.19%	278.94	129.69	2019
Equatorial Guinea	1715	12116.92	26.84%	3252.64	1896.95	11.21%	1358.28	792.15	2022
Greece	10361	238206.31	48.42%	115339.96	11131.81	50.94%	121351.02	11711.96	2022
Guatemala	17602	102050.47	12.98%	13246.45	752.54	14.09%	14376.09	816.71	2022
Honduras	10594	34400.51	22.21%	7640.32	721.21	24.39%	8391.13	792.08	2020
Croatia	3853	82688.84	36.05%	29807.90	7735.88	38.35%	31709.70	8229.45	2022
Hungary	9590	212388.91	37.94%	80588.09	8403.46	42.42%	90088.91	9394.17	2022
Indonesia	277534	1371171.15	15.14%	207635.95	748.15	15.80%	216699.21	780.80	2022
India	1428628	3549918.92	13.19%	468182.23	327.71	15.66%	556028.48	389.20	2018
Ireland	5262	545629.45	22.19%	121048.56	23002.62	19.79%	107987.75	20520.70	2022
Iran	74323	416397.03	25.38%	105665.86	1421.72	19.64%	81769.49	1100.20	2009
Iraq	45505	250842.78	38.60%	96834.92	2128.03	27.61%	69263.05	1522.11	2019
Iceland	394	31020.03	31.16%	9666.71	24559.73	33.09%	10265.54	26081.16	2022
Israel	9757	509901.50	33.19%	169232.12	17345.22	35.20%	179507.20	18398.35	2022
Italy	58761	2254851.21	40.28%	908219.27	15456.12	49.09%	1106981.13	18838.66	2022
Jamaica	2826	19423.36	29.25%	5682.07	2010.96	29.83%	5793.91	2050.55	2020
Jordan	11337	50813.64	23.51%	11947.07	1053.81	28.86%	14666.04	1293.64	2022
Japan	124517	4212945.16	19.75%	832062.39	6682.34	20.96%	883073.67	7092.01	2022
Kazakhstan	19900	261421.12	12.34%	32254.61	1620.82	17.12%	44746.20	2248.53	2021
Kenya	55101	107440.58	18.76%	20158.30	365.85	20.71%	22246.96	403.75	2021
Kyrgyzstan	7101	13987.63	29.88%	4179.38	588.58	23.83%	3333.52	469.46	2022
Cambodia	16945	31772.76	18.15%	5765.70	340.26	18.45%	5861.44	345.91	2021
Kiribati	134	279.03	66.01%	184.19	1379.55	81.74%	228.08	1708.27	2022
Saint Kitts and Nevis	48	1077.03	28.46%	306.51	6418.45	26.75%	288.10	6032.89	2020
South Korea	51713	1712792.85	32.00%	548165.04	10600.22	33.64%	576235.45	11143.03	2022
Kuwait	1820	25943.71	43.76%	11353.34	6239.66	46.51%	12065.39	6631.00	1998
Laos	7634	15843.16	13.91%	2204.41	288.77	10.32%	1634.38	214.10	2022
Lebanon	5354	17937.26	6.87%	1231.94	230.10	6.30%	1129.28	210.93	2021
Liberia	2048	863.93	32.20%	278.20	135.87	34.38%	297.00	145.05	1982
Saint Lucia	180	2519.93	19.41%	489.06	2713.24	17.61%	443.78	2462.03	2017
Sri Lanka	22037	84356.86	8.22%	6938.14	314.84	15.74%	13279.86	602.62	2022
Lesotho	2330	2046.04	36.99%	756.75	324.74	41.38%	846.71	363.34	2022
Lithuania	2872	77836.40	33.17%	25820.01	8990.58	34.11%	26546.23	9243.45	2022
Luxembourg	669	85755.01	41.07%	35222.05	52679.83	40.49%	34719.06	51927.53	2022
Latvia	1882	43627.08	40.73%	17768.89	9442.75	48.13%	20996.33	11157.87	2022
Macau	704	47061.84	20.99%	9877.15	14027.07	50.11%	23581.89	33489.91	2022
Morocco	37840	141109.37	26.90%	37952.83	1002.98	28.22%	39816.00	1052.22	2022
Moldova	2487	16539.44	29.34%	4853.32	1951.56	32.28%	5338.66	2146.72	2022
Madagascar	30326	16031.70	10.21%	1636.42	53.96	9.95%	1595.48	52.61	2022
Maldives	521	6600.00	24.77%	1634.80	3137.68	29.46%	1944.68	3732.44	2021
Mexico	128456	1788886.82	19.32%	345589.93	2690.35	22.36%	400009.84	3113.99	2022
Marshall Islands	42	284.00	31.41%	89.21	2124.34	59.70%	169.55	4037.39	2020
North Macedonia	1812	14761.24	28.84%	4256.67	2349.18	33.33%	4919.88	2715.20	2021
Mali	23294	20904.90	15.01%	3137.09	134.68	14.50%	3031.44	130.14	2020
Malta	553	20957.00	33.26%	6970.55	12600.10	37.71%	7901.89	14283.61	2022
Myanmar	54578	64815.03	14.39%	9326.36	170.88	13.78%	8928.61	163.59	2019
Mongolia	3447	19872.18	28.99%	5760.99	1671.23	31.70%	6298.82	1827.25	2021
Mozambique	33897	20624.60	25.21%	5198.63	153.36	26.68%	5502.12	162.32	2022
Mauritius	1261	14397.13	23.86%	3434.63	2723.65	28.21%	4061.62	3220.85	2022
Malawi	20932	14084.34	13.38%	1884.78	90.04	19.10%	2689.78	128.50	2022
Malaysia	34309	399648.83	16.43%	65670.28	1914.11	17.93%	71663.41	2088.79	2022
Namibia	2604	12351.02	31.30%	3865.27	1484.26	35.72%	4412.29	1694.31	2022
Niger	6173	2508.52	14.61%	366.48	59.37	10.16%	254.98	41.30	1980
Nicaragua	7046	17829.22	21.48%	3830.48	543.62	16.67%	2972.58	421.86	2022
Netherlands	17879	1118124.75	39.33%	439783.75	24597.11	39.50%	441640.78	24700.97	2022
Norway	5520	485513.32	56.35%	273568.46	49563.15	29.40%	142733.36	25859.39	2022
Nepal	30897	40908.07	19.88%	8133.39	263.25	19.44%	7953.30	257.42	2021
Nauru	13	154.13	138.82%	213.96	16742.08	103.60%	159.67	12493.79	2020
New Zealand	5223	253465.70	33.61%	85190.57	16310.35	35.93%	91059.06	17433.91	2022
Pakistan	154370	99484.80	11.06%	11003.45	71.28	12.78%	12710.28	82.34	2000
Panama	4468	83382.40	11.15%	9300.22	2081.48	17.14%	14290.60	3198.37	2021
Peru	34353	267603.25	20.67%	55326.61	1610.55	22.84%	61131.80	1779.53	2021
Philippines	117337	437146.37	16.08%	70305.13	599.17	18.61%	81339.34	693.21	2022
Palau	18	263.02	24.01%	63.16	3497.58	58.46%	153.76	8514.84	2020
Papua New Guinea	10330	30932.50	15.34%	4745.52	459.40	19.48%	6024.35	583.19	2022
Poland	36686	811229.10	34.07%	276359.98	7533.15	36.26%	294138.02	8017.75	2022
Portugal	10525	287080.01	38.02%	109135.81	10368.86	39.50%	113389.37	10772.98	2022
Paraguay	6862	42956.26	17.40%	7472.56	1089.05	16.54%	7103.00	1035.19	2022
Palestine	5166	17396.30	23.39%	4069.33	787.75	26.17%	4552.00	881.18	2021
Romania	19056	351002.58	31.34%	110014.22	5773.17	36.86%	129369.90	6788.89	2022
Russia	143826	2021421.48	27.31%	552017.14	3838.09	31.75%	641852.24	4462.70	2022
Rwanda	14095	14097.77	21.38%	3014.36	213.87	21.53%	3035.24	215.35	2020
Saudi Arabia	36947	1067582.93	30.51%	325673.17	8814.60	24.56%	262160.06	7095.57	2022
Sudan	39377	42630.38	8.77%	3740.45	94.99	9.73%	4146.33	105.30	2016
Senegal	17763	31013.99	22.28%	6910.22	389.02	23.26%	7213.99	406.12	2022
Singapore	5918	501427.50	16.22%	81334.19	13744.34	15.14%	75894.95	12825.19	2022
Solomon Islands	740	1631.29	23.06%	376.17	508.05	27.05%	441.29	596.00	2022
El Salvador	6365	34015.62	28.57%	9719.87	1527.10	29.51%	10037.15	1576.94	2021
San Marino	34	1855.38	40.33%	748.25	22241.52	44.07%	817.74	24307.19	2021
Somalia	18143	11679.80	0.00%	0.01	0.00	0.00%	0.02	0.00	2020
Serbia	6618	75187.13	40.62%	30544.04	4615.28	37.27%	28025.26	4234.69	2022
Slovakia	5427	132793.62	37.97%	50415.26	9290.16	39.85%	52912.56	9750.34	2022
Slovenia	2121	68216.78	39.17%	26723.27	12599.75	40.57%	27677.12	13049.48	2022
Sweden	10537	593267.70	32.70%	193977.46	18409.82	31.66%	187832.42	17826.61	2022
Eswatini	1211	4597.86	24.86%	1143.10	944.07	24.39%	1121.58	926.29	2021
Seychelles	120	2141.45	29.38%	629.20	5253.29	44.23%	947.23	7908.57	2020
Togo	9054	9171.26	15.05%	1380.63	152.49	16.16%	1481.67	163.65	2022
Thailand	71801	514944.99	18.25%	93970.23	1308.75	21.50%	110725.68	1542.11	2022
Tajikistan	10144	12060.60	17.07%	2058.73	202.96	10.69%	1289.41	127.12	2022
Timor-Leste	1361	2243.14	51.53%	1155.88	849.54	52.56%	1178.92	866.47	2022
Tonga	108	500.27	25.11%	125.64	1165.81	32.90%	164.62	1527.43	2020
Trinidad and Tobago	1535	28139.94	23.96%	6742.20	4392.50	32.90%	9257.91	6031.46	2019
Tunisia	11174	47311.40	29.88%	14134.84	1264.93	33.76%	15974.28	1429.54	2012
Turkey	85326	1108022.37	25.76%	285411.53	3344.95	29.67%	328755.36	3852.93	2022
Tanzania	67438	79158.29	14.00%	11079.78	164.30	16.85%	13335.72	197.75	2022
Uganda	48582	49272.88	13.78%	6789.11	139.74	16.94%	8348.03	171.83	2022
Ukraine	37000	178757.02	32.96%	58911.82	1592.21	57.89%	103490.96	2797.05	2022
Uruguay	3423	77240.83	30.79%	23778.98	6946.61	34.62%	26740.91	7811.88	2020
United States	334915	27360935.00	19.57%	5353329.08	15984.15	24.50%	6702267.26	20011.85	2022
Uzbekistan	36412	90889.15	21.38%	19431.09	533.64	21.01%	19097.91	524.49	2020
Saint Vincent and the Grenadines	104	1065.96	25.57%	272.52	2628.03	24.73%	263.63	2542.28	2017
Vanuatu	335	1126.31	30.54%	344.01	1028.42	34.26%	385.85	1153.50	2021
Samoa	226	934.10	33.47%	312.62	1385.25	35.08%	327.68	1451.96	2021
South Africa	60414	377781.60	30.40%	114831.78	1900.73	33.62%	126995.34	2102.07	2022
Zambia	20570	28162.63	21.97%	6186.60	300.76	25.14%	7079.27	344.16	2021
Zimbabwe	16665	26538.27	8.12%	2154.10	129.26	10.98%	2913.18	174.80	2018
SIDS (Small Island Developing States)									
SIDS: Pacific	2678	11232.23	25.40%	2852.63	1065.32	36.44%	4093.57	1528.75	2021
LDCs (Least developed countries)	1150347	1504251.16	14.82%	223004.04	193.86	13.38%	201236.35	174.94	2019
Low & middle income economies (WB)	6527353	36438640.51	17.94%	6538494.87	1001.71				2022
Middle-income economies (WB)	5823625	35907869.70	18.48%	6635112.29	1139.34				2022
Lower middle income economies (WB)	3059565	7384750.13	14.56%	1075316.32	351.46	15.74%	1162688.25	380.02	2018
Upper middle income economies (WB)	2803250	28567593.04	18.53%	5293726.65	1888.42				2022
High-income economies (WB)	1403022	67653743.40	27.37%	18514717.15	13196.32	29.88%	20212200.39	14406.19	2022
European Union	449477	18349388.45	35.92%	6591433.93	14664.68	39.84%	7310597.33	16264.68	2022
OECD (Organisation for Economic Cooperation and Development)	1385006	64098865.77	27.29%	17492484.08	12629.90	29.95%	19196963.24	13860.57	2022
Notes: WB: Revenue is cash receipts from taxes, social contributions, and other revenues such as fines, fees, rent, and income from property or sales. Grants are also considered as revenue but are excluded here. Expense is cash payments for operating activities of the government in providing goods and services. It includes compensation of employees (such as wages and salaries), interest and subsidies, grants, social benefits, and other expenses such as rent and dividends. GDP at purchaser's prices is the sum of gross value added by all resident producers in the economy plus any product taxes and minus any subsidies not included in the value of the products. It is calculated without making deductions for depreciation of fabricated assets or for depletion and degradation of natural resources. Data are in current U.S. dollars. Dollar figures for GDP are converted from domestic currencies using single year official exchange rates. For a few countries where the official exchange rate does not reflect the rate effectively applied to actual foreign exchange transactions, an alternative conversion factor is used. Total population is based on the de facto definition of population, which counts all residents regardless of legal status or citizenship. The values shown are midyear estimates.

== See also ==
- List of countries by government budget
- List of countries by tax revenue to GDP ratio
- List of countries by government spending as percentage of GDP
- List of countries by total health expenditure per capita
- List of countries by household final consumption expenditure per capita
- List of countries by military expenditure per capita
