= List of sovereign states in Europe by Human Development Index =

Map of the European countries by HDI value in 2022 (includes transcontinental countries). Very high HDI ≥ 0.920 0.890–0.919 0.850–0.889 0.800–0.849 High HDI < 0.800

The Human Development Index (HDI) is a summary measure of average achievement in key dimensions of human development: a long and healthy life, knowledge, and a decent standard of living. It is a standard means of measuring well-being. It is used to distinguish whether the country is a developed, developing, or underdeveloped country, and also to measure the impact of economic policies on quality of life. Countries fall into four broad categories based on their HDI: very high, high, medium, and low human development. Currently, all European countries fall into the very high or high human development category.

== List ==
The table below presents the latest Human Development Index (HDI) for countries in Europe as included in a United Nations Development Programme's Human Development Report (released in 2020). Previous HDI values and rankings are retroactively recalculated using the same updated data sets and current methodologies, as presented in Table 2 of the Statistical Annex of the Human Development Report.

Countries that are not entirely located in Europe are shown here in italics, but HDI figures are given for the whole country. Monaco and Vatican City are not ranked as they are not included in the latest report by the United Nations Development Programme. Kosovo is also not included.

List of European countries by Human Development Index
Rank		Country	Human Development Index (HDI)					
Region	World	Country	HDI 2023	HDI 2022	HDI 2021	HDI 2020	HDI 2019	HDI 2015
Very High Human Development
1	1	Iceland	0.972	0.964	0.967	0.965	0.969	0.956
2	2	Switzerland	0.970	0.966	0.968	0.963	0.965	0.957
2	2	Norway	0.970	0.967	0.969	0.969	0.967	0.959
4	4	Denmark	0.962	0.959	0.958	0.954	0.953	0.943
5	5	Sweden	0.959	0.959	0.958	0.951	0.955	0.945
5	5	Germany	0.959	0.955	0.958	0.955	0.957	0.948
7	8	Netherlands	0.955	0.953	0.951	0.945	0.950	0.940
8	10	Belgium	0.951	0.945	0.948	0.939	0.945	0.933
9	11	Ireland	0.949	0.947	0.946	0.948	0.947	0.931
10	12	Finland	0.948	0.946	0.949	0.947	0.947	0.938
11	13	United Kingdom	0.946	0.946	0.941	0.930	0.941	0.931
12	17	Liechtenstein	0.938	0.936	0.933	0.929	0.935	0.925
13	21	Slovenia	0.931	0.926	0.924	0.918	0.923	0.909
14	22	Austria	0.930	0.927	0.930	0.925	0.928	0.919
15	24	Malta	0.924	0.917	0.914	0.903	0.910	0.892
16	25	Luxembourg	0.922	0.922	0.918	0.916	0.916	0.913
17	26	France	0.920	0.916	0.915	0.909	0.914	0.901
18	28	Spain	0.918	0.911	0.912	0.901	0.910	0.895
19	29	San Marino	0.915	0.910	0.903	0.895	0.908	0.896
19	29	Italy	0.915	0.905	0.908	0.899	0.906	0.889
19	29	Czech Republic	0.915	0.911	0.901	0.898	0.903	0.900
22	32	Cyprus (Note: Geographically, Cyprus is generally included in Western Asia or the Middle East, but it has been historically and culturally a European country.)	0.913	0.908	0.907	0.905	0.907	0.882
22	32	Andorra	0.913	0.893	0.871	0.851	0.876	0.869
24	34	Greece	0.908	0.897	0.897	0.896	0.896	0.888
25	35	Poland	0.906	0.902	0.884	0.880	0.887	0.879
26	36	Estonia	0.905	0.902	0.899	0.901	0.901	0.888
27	39	Lithuania	0.895	0.888	0.887	0.888	0.894	0.869
28	40	Portugal	0.890	0.883	0.876	0.870	0.872	0.857
29	41	Latvia	0.889	0.881	0.871	0.879	0.880	0.859
30	42	Croatia	0.889	0.886	0.876	0.867	0.872	0.852
31	43	Slovakia	0.880	0.873	0.859	0.867	0.871	0.861
32	44	Hungary	0.870	0.867	0.852	0.857	0.861	0.853
33	45	Montenegro	0.862	0.853	0.840	0.841	0.851	0.839
34	50	Turkey (Note: The European portion of Turkey comprises 3% of the country, making it a transcontinental country.)	0.853	0.853	0.841	0.838	0.841	0.821
35	55	Romania	0.845	0.840	0.829	0.832	0.838	0.823
35	55	Bulgaria	0.845	0.835	0.817	0.826	0.835	0.824
37	57	Georgia	0.844	0.838	0.819	0.822	0.830	0.807
38	60	Kazakhstan (Note: Kazakhstan is mainly located in Central Asia with a small portion west of the Ural River located in Eastern Europe.)	0.837	0.831	0.816	0.826	0.834	0.819
39	62	Serbia	0.833	0.826	0.807	0.809	0.817	0.802
40	64	Russia	0.832	0.826	0.813	0.818	0.847	0.833
41	65	Belarus	0.824	0.824	0.817	0.815	0.826	0.825
42	68	North Macedonia	0.815	0.811	0.781	0.783	0.805	0.795
43	69	Armenia (Note: Armenia is located in the South Caucasus, south of the most commonly used dividing line between Europe and Asia. Some less common definitions include the entire Caucasus region in Europe. The country has political, historical and cultural ties with Europe.)	0.811	0.801	0.786	0.761	0.796	0.777
44	71	Albania	0.810	0.806	0.794	0.794	0.805	0.797
45	74	Bosnia and Herzegovina	0.804	0.799	0.783	0.783	0.788	0.769
High Human Development
46	81	Azerbaijan (Note: Geographically, Azerbaijan is located in the South Caucasus region of Eurasia, straddling Western Asia and Eastern Europe.)	0.789	0.784	0.765	0.757	0.780	0.771
47	86	Moldova	0.785	0.784	0.773	0.770	0.775	0.759
48	87	Ukraine	0.779	0.772	0.772	0.783	0.789	0.778

== Map ==
This is the map of the list of European countries by the Human Development Index for the year 2023. The colour indicators are as follows: High Human Development and Very High Human Development.

== See also ==
- International organisations in Europe
- List of countries by GDP (nominal)
- List of countries by GDP (nominal) per capita
- List of countries by GDP (PPP)
- List of countries by GDP (PPP) per capita
- List of countries by Human Development Index
- List of countries by Human Development Index by region
- List of countries by percentage of population living in poverty
- List of European countries by budget revenues
- List of European countries by budget revenues per capita
- List of European countries by GDP (nominal) per capita
- List of European countries by GNI (nominal) per capita
- List of European countries by GNI (PPP) per capita
