= List of Central European countries by development indexes =

World map of countries by Human Development Index categories in increments of 0.050 (based on 2022 data, published 2024): ≥ 0.900 0.850–0.899 0.800–0.849 0.750–0.799 0.700–0.749 / 0.650–0.699 0.600–0.649 0.550–0.599 0.500–0.549 0.450–0.499 / 0.400–0.449 ≤ 0.399 Data unavailable

World map representing Human Development Index categories (based on 2017 data, published in 2018): 0.800–1.000 (very high) 0.700–0.799 (high) 0.555–0.699 (medium) / 0.350–0.554 (low) Data unavailable

This is a partial list of Central European countries by development indexes such as the Globalisation index, Human Development Index, Press Freedom Index, Legatum Prosperity Index, EF English Proficiency Index, and other statistical measures and rankings.

The concept of what countries belong to Central Europe is not well-defined, so tables or lists below may show different countries listed.

== Economy ==
=== Human Development Index ===
World map by quartiles of Human Development Index in 2013: Very High / Low; High / Data unavailable; Medium

Countries in descending order of Human Development Index (2023 data):

- Switzerland: 0.970 (ranked 2)
- Germany: 0.959 (ranked 5)
- Liechtenstein: 0.938 (ranked 17)
- Slovenia: 0.931 (ranked 21)
- Austria: 0.930 (ranked 22)
- Czech Republic: 0.915 (ranked 29)
- Poland: 0.906 (ranked 35)
- Croatia: 0.889 (ranked 41)
- Slovakia: 0.880 (ranked 44)
- Hungary: 0.870 (ranked 46)
- Romania: 0.845 (ranked 55)
- Serbia: 0.833 (ranked 62)

=== Globalisation ===
Map showing the score for the KOF Globalization Index

The index of globalization in Central European countries (2023 data):

- Switzerland: 88.69 (ranked 2)
- Austria: 86.78 (ranked 6)
- Germany: 86.40 (ranked 7)
- Luxembourg: 84.79 (ranked 11)
- Hungary: 82.01 (ranked 19)
- Czech Republic: 81.86 (ranked 21)
- Slovakia: 80.17 (ranked 23)
- Croatia: 79.92 (ranked 24)
- Slovenia: 79.49 (ranked 26)
- Poland: 77.70 (ranked 31)
- Serbia: 77.36 (ranked 33)
- Romania: 77.08 (ranked 36)

=== Prosperity Index ===
The Legatum Prosperity Index ranks Central European countries as follows (2026 data):

- Switzerland (ranked 1)
- Germany (ranked 8)
- Luxembourg (ranked 11)
- Austria (ranked 15)
- Czech Republic (ranked 20)
- Slovenia (ranked 22)
- Slovakia (ranked 35)
- Poland (ranked 36)
- Croatia (ranked 37)
- Romania (ranked 40)
- Hungary (ranked 47)
- Serbia (ranked 58)

=== Corruption ===
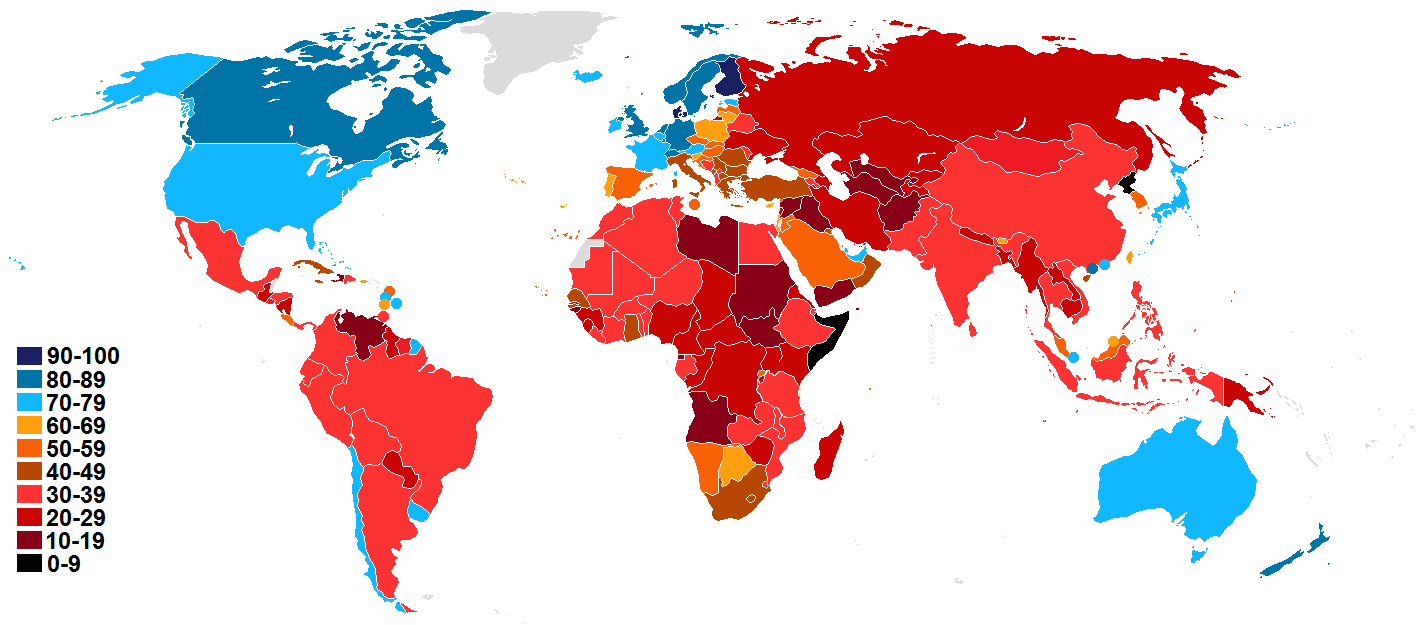
Overview of the index of perception of corruption, 2015: 90–100 / 60–69 / 30–39 / 0–9; 80–89 / 50–59 / 20–29 / No information; 70–79 / 40–49 / 10–19

Most countries in Central Europe tend to score above the average in the Corruption Perceptions Index (2018 data):

- Switzerland (ranked 3, tied)
- Germany (ranked 11, tied)
- Austria (ranked 14, tied)
- Poland (ranked 36, tied)
- Slovenia (ranked 36, tied)
- Czech Republic (ranked 38, tied)
- Slovakia (ranked 57)
- Croatia (ranked 60)
- Hungary (ranked 64, tied)
- Romania (ranked 66)
- Serbia (ranked 87, tied)

== Education ==
=== Languages ===
Languages taught as the first language in Central Europe are: Croatian, Czech, French, German, Hungarian, Italian, Polish, Romansh, Serbian, Slovak and Slovenian. The most popular language taught at schools in Central Europe as foreign languages are: English, German and French. Countries ranked by the EF English Proficiency Index in 2025:

- Croatia: 617 (ranked 2)
- Austria: 616 (ranked 3)
- Germany: 615 (ranked 4)
- Slovakia: 606 (ranked 10)
- Romania: 605 (ranked 11)
- Poland: 600 (ranked 15)
- Hungary: 590 (ranked 22)
- Czech Republic: 582 (ranked 23)
- Serbia: 578 (ranked 25)
- Switzerland: 564 (ranked 30)

Other languages, also popular (spoken by over 5% as a second language):

- Croatian in Slovenia (61%)
- French in Romania (17%), Germany (14%) and Austria (11%)
- German in Slovenia (42%), Croatia (34%), Slovakia (22%), Poland (20%), Hungary (18%), the Czech Republic (15%) and Romania (5%)
- Hungarian in Romania (9%), Serbia (7%) Slovakia (12%)
- Italian in Croatia (14%), Slovenia (12%), Austria (9%) and Romania (7%)
- Russian in Poland (28%), Slovakia (17%), the Czech Republic (13%) and Germany (6%)
- Polish in Slovakia (5%)
- Slovak in the Czech Republic (16%), Serbia (2%)
- Spanish in Romania (5%)

=== Education performance ===
Student performance has varied across Central Europe, according to the Programme for International Student Assessment (PISA). The following table shows latests average scores in mathematics, science and reading.

Average PISA scores (2025)
Country	Mathematics	Science	Reading
Switzerland	499	501	470
Poland	484	495	482
Austria	477	497	467
Czech Republic	477	490	468
Slovakia	469	475	448
Germany	464	486	465
Slovenia	460	484	445
Hungary	459	480	452
Luxembourg	458	474	443
Croatia	455	476	453
Romania	419	425	413
Serbia	417	429	415
OECD average	463	482	461

=== Higher education ===
==== Universities ====
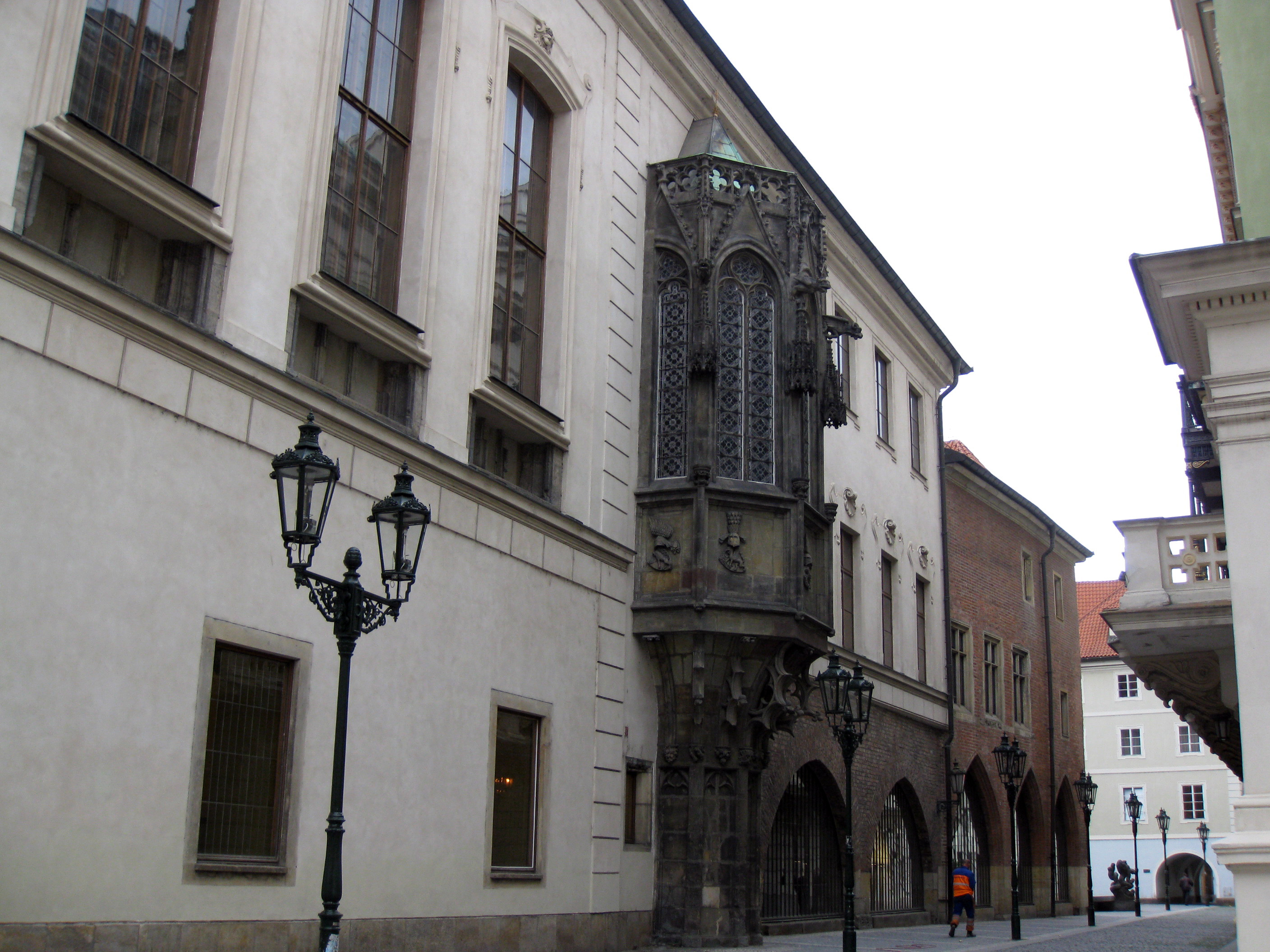
Karolinum of the Charles University in Prague

The first university east of France and north of the Alps was the Charles University in Prague established in 1347 or 1348 by Charles IV, Holy Roman Emperor and modeled on the University of Paris, with the full number of faculties (law, medicine, philosophy and theology). The list of Central Europe's oldest universities in continuous operation, established by 1500, include (by their dates of foundation):

- Czech Republic Charles University in Prague, Czech Republic (1348)
- Poland Jagiellonian University in Kraków, Poland (1364)
- Austria University of Vienna in Vienna, Austria (1365)
- Hungary University of Pécs in Pécs, Hungary (1367)
- Germany Heidelberg University in Heidelberg, Germany (1386)
- Germany Cologne University in Cologne, Germany (1388)
- Croatia University of Zadar in Zadar, Croatia (1396)
- Germany University of Leipzig in Leipzig, Germany (1409)
- Germany University of Rostock in Rostock, Germany (1419)
- Germany University of Greifswald in Greifswald, Germany (1456)
- Germany University of Freiburg in Freiburg, Germany (1457)
- Switzerland University of Basel in Basel, Switzerland (1460)
- Germany LMU Munich in Munich, Germany (1472)
- Germany University of Tübingen in Tübingen, Germany (1477)

==== Regional exchange program ====
Central European Exchange Program for University Studies (CEEPUS) is an international exchange program for students and teachers teaching or studying in participating countries. Its current members include (year it joined for the first time in brackets):

- Albania (2006)
- Austria (2005)
- Bosnia and Herzegovina (2008)
- Bulgaria (2005)
- Croatia (2005)
- Czech Republic (2005)
- Hungary (2005)
- Kosovo* (2008)
- Macedonia (2006)
- Moldova (2011)
- Montenegro (2006)
- Poland (2005)
- Romania (2005)
- Serbia (2005)
- Slovakia (2005)
- Slovenia (2005)

== Culture and society ==
=== Architecture ===
Central European architecture has been shaped by major European styles including but not limited to: Brick Gothic, Rococo, Secession (art) and Modern architecture. Seven Central European countries are amongst those countries with higher numbers of World Heritage Sites:

- Germany (position 5th, 42 sites)
- Poland (position 18th, 16 sites)
- Czech Republic (position 22nd, 12 sites)
- Switzerland (position 25th, 12 sites)
- Austria (position 27th, 10 sites)
- Croatia (position 29th, 10 sites)
- Hungary (8 sites)
- Serbia (position 35th, 6 sites)

=== Media ===
2021 Press Freedom Index results

There is a whole spectrum of media active in the region: newspapers, television and internet channels, radio channels, internet websites etc. Central European media are regarded as free, according to the Press Freedom Index, although the situation in Poland, Hungary and Croatia is described as "problematic". Some of the top scoring countries in the Press Freedom Index are in Central Europe, and include:

- Switzerland (position 7)
- Austria (position 11)
- Germany (position 16)
- Slovakia (position 17)
- Czech Republic (position 23)
- Liechtenstein (position 32)
- Slovenia (position 37)
- Romania (position 43)
- Poland (position 54)
- Hungary (position 71)
- Croatia (position 74)
- Serbia (position 76)

== Politics ==
=== Democracy ===
European countries score very highly in the Democracy Index:

- Switzerland (position 6)
- Germany (position 13)
- Austria (position 14)
- Czech Republic (position 25)
- Slovenia (position 37)
- Poland (position 40)
- Slovakia (position 45)
- Croatia (position 50)
- Hungary (position 51)
- Serbia (position 57)
- Romania (position 61)
- Liechtenstein (not listed)

=== Global Peace Index ===
Global Peace Index Scores

In spite of its turbulent history, Central Europe is currently one of the world's safest regions. Most Central European countries are in top 20%:

- Austria (position 3)
- Switzerland (position 5)
- Czech Republic (position 11)
- Slovenia (position 14)
- Germany (position 17)
- Slovakia (position 19)
- Poland (position 23)
- Hungary (position 22)
- Serbia (position 23)
- Romania (position 24)
- Croatia (position 26)
- Liechtenstein (not listed)

== See also ==
- American Human Development Project
- Central and Eastern Europe
- Central European Initiative
- Democracy Index
- East-Central Europe
- Global Peace Index
- List of African countries by Human Development Index
- List of sovereign states in Europe by Human Development Index
- List of sovereign states in Asia and Oceania by Human Development Index
- List of countries by Human Development Index
- List of countries by Human Development Index by region
- Mitteleuropa
- Organization for Security and Co-operation in Europe statistics
