= List of sovereign states in Europe by unemployment rate =

This is a list of European countries by unemployment and employment rate.

== Map ==
Blue	Below 5%
Green	5.0 to 9.9%
Orange	10 to 14.9%
Red	Over 15%

== Table ==
State (51)	Unemployment rate	Employment rate	Date
Albania	8.1%	69.6%	2025 Q3
Andorra	1.5%	83.0%	2024
Armenia	14.0%	50.1%	2025 Q1
(European Union) Austria	5.8%	77.4% (2024)	June 2025
Azerbaijan	5.3%	66.3%	2024
Belarus	2.6%	68.0%	2025 Q2
(European Union) Belgium	6.5%	72.3% (2024)	June 2025
Bosnia and Herzegovina	12.3%	55.9% (2023)	May 2025
(European Union) Bulgaria	3.7%	76.8% (2024)	June 2025
(European Union) Croatia	4.4%	73.6% (2024)	June 2025
(European Union) Cyprus	3.8%	79.8% (2024)	June 2025
(European Union) Czech Republic	3.0%	82.3% (2024)	June 2025
(European Union) Denmark	6.7%	80.2% (2024)	June 2025
(European Union) Estonia	7.7%	81.8% (2024)	June 2025
(European Union) Finland	10.6%	77.0% (2024)	June 2025
(European Union) France	7.0%	75.1% (2024)	June 2025
(Georgia (country)) Georgia	14.3%	46.4%	2025 Q2
(European Union) Germany	3.7%	81.3% (2024)	June 2025
(European Union) Greece	7.5%	69.3% (2024)	Dec 2025
(European Union) Hungary	4.4%	81.1% (2024)	June 2025
Iceland	3.6%	87.0% (2024)	May 2025
(Republic of Ireland) (European Union) Ireland	4.9%	79.8% (2024)	July 2025
(European Union) Italy	6.3%	67.1% (2024)	June 2025
Kazakhstan	4.6%	64.6%	2025 Q2
Kosovo	10.9%	38.8%	2024 Q4
(European Union) Latvia	6.9%	77.4% (2024)	June 2025
Liechtenstein	1.4%	78.2%	2023
(European Union) Lithuania	6.4%	79.2% (2024)	June 2025
(European Union) Luxembourg	6.6%	74.2% (2024)	June 2025
(European Union) Malta	2.5%	83.0% (2024)	June 2025
Moldova	4.4%	40.9%	2025 Q1
Monaco	-	-	-
Montenegro	9.1%	53.1% (2024)	June 2025
(European Union) Netherlands	3.8%	83.5% (2024)	July 2025
North Macedonia	11.7%	46.3%	2025 Q1
Norway	5.4%	80.0% (2024)	June 2025
(European Union) Poland	3.5%	78.4% (2024)	June 2025
(European Union) Portugal	6.0%	78.5% (2024)	June 2025
(European Union) Romania	5.8%	69.5% (2024)	June 2025
Russia	2.2%	59.1%	2024
San Marino	4.1%	70.7%	June 2025
Serbia	8.5%	51.5%	2025 Q2
(European Union) Slovakia	5.3%	78.1% (2024)	June 2025
(European Union) Slovenia	3.7%	78.3% (2024)	June 2025
(European Union) Spain	10.4%	71.4% (2024)	June 2025
(European Union) Sweden	8.9%	81.9% (2024)	July 2025
Switzerland	4.5%	83.0% (2024)	March 2025
Turkey	8.6%	58.5% (2024)	June 2025
Ukraine	12.7%	51.5%	2025
United Kingdom	4.7%	75.3%	June 2025
Vatican City	-	-	

== See also ==
- International organisations in Europe
- List of European regions by unemployment rate
- List of European countries by budget revenues
- List of European countries by GDP (nominal) per capita
- List of European countries by GDP (PPP) per capita
- List of European countries by GNI (nominal) per capita
- List of European countries by GNI (PPP) per capita
- List of countries by GDP (nominal) per capita
- List of countries by GDP (PPP) per capita
- List of countries by GDP (nominal)
- List of countries by GDP (PPP)
