= List of sovereign states in Europe by Press Freedom Index =

This is a list and map of European countries by the Press Freedom Index for the year 2021.

== Map ==

=== Legend ===
Good situation (0 - 15)

Satisfactory situation (15.01 - 25)

Problematic situation (25.01 - 35)

Difficult situation (35.01 - 55)

Very serious situation (55.01 - 100)

== Table ==
Rank	Country	Index
1	Norway	6.72
2	Finland	6.99
3	Sweden	7.24
4	Denmark	8.57
5	Netherlands	9.67
6	Portugal	10.11
7	Switzerland	10.55
8	Belgium	11.69
9	Ireland	11.91
10	Germany	15.24
11	Estonia	15.25
12	Iceland	15.37
13	Austria	16.34
14	Luxembourg	17.56
15	Latvia	19.26
16	Liechtenstein	19.49
17	Cyprus	19.85
18	Lithuania	20.15
19	Spain	20.44
20	United Kingdom	21.59
21	France	22.60
22	Slovakia	23.02
23	Slovenia	23.10
24	Andorra	23.32
25	Czech Republic	23.38
26	Italy	23.39
27	Romania	24.91
28	Croatia	27.95
29	Bosnia and Herzegovina	28.34
30	Georgia	28.64
31	Armenia	28.83
32	Poland	28.84
33	Greece	29.01
34	Kosovo	30.32
35	Malta	30.46
36	Albania	30.59
37	Moldova	31.61
38	North Macedonia	31.67
39	Hungary	31.76
40	Serbia	32.03
41	Ukraine	32.96
42	Montenegro	34.33
43	Bulgaria	37.29
44	Russia	48.71
45	Turkey	49.79
46	Kazakhstan	50.28
47	Belarus	50.82
48	Azerbaijan	58.77

== See also ==
- International organisations in Europe
- List of European countries by budget revenues
- List of European countries by budget revenues per capita
- List of European countries by GNI (nominal) per capita
