= List of European countries by minimum wage =

The following list provides information relating to the minimum wages (gross) of countries in Europe.

The calculations are based on the assumption of a 40-hour working week and a 52-week year, with the exceptions of France (35 hours), Belgium (38 hours), United Kingdom (38 hours), Germany (38 hours), Ireland (39 hours) and Monaco (39 hours). Most minimum wages are fixed at a monthly rate, but some countries set their minimum wage at an hourly rate or annual rate.

== Maps ==
=== Net income ===
The map below shows adult, minimum monthly income after the deduction of taxes and social charges; some countries have a different rate for certain age brackets (e.g. under 21).

Purple	€1,200 and above
Light blue	€600 to €1,199
Yellow	€300 to €599
Red	below €300

Countries marked on the map in dark red do not have a minimum wage.

=== Net income (adjusted for living costs in purchasing power parity) ===
The map below shows adult, minimum monthly income after the deduction of taxes and social charges, and adjusted for living costs expressed in purchasing power parity (PPP).

Purple	$2,000 and above
Light blue	$1,400 to $1,999
Yellow	$700 to $1,398
Red	below $700

Countries marked on the map in dark red do not have a minimum wage.

=== Gross income ===
The map below shows adult, minimum monthly income before the deduction of taxes and social charges; some countries have a different rate for certain age brackets (e.g. under 21).

Purple	€1,500 and above
Light blue	€1,000 to €1,499
Yellow	€500 to €999
Red	below €500

Countries marked on the map in dark red do not have a minimum wage.

Disparities between gross-to-net income ratios, across countries, result from the differences in their national tax systems.

== Minimum wages by country ==
Country names link to their "Economy of" pages.

Minimum wages by country. Currencies: local, USD, Eur, and Int$ PPP.
Country	Monthly minimum wage				Hourly rate (gross)			Exchange rate to EUR	Effective at
Country	Net (EUR)	Net (PPP) (Note: Formula: Net amount in local currency / (divided by) PPP conversion rate. The value is expressed in Int$.)	Gross (EUR)	Local currency	Local	USD	PPP (Note: Formula: Hourly amount in local currency / (divided by) PPP conversion rate. The value is expressed in Int$.)	Exchange rate to EUR	Effective at
Albania	460	839	518	50,000 Lek	287 Lek	3.5	5.43	0.0101	1 Jan 2026
Andorra	1353	2207	1447	€1,447.33	€8.35	8.66	13.62	1	1 Jan 2025
Belarus	190	771	214	Rbls 726.00	Rbls 4.34	1.32	5.17	0.2944	1 Jan 2025
Belgium	1959	2775	2070	€2,070.48	€12.57	13.58	17.80	1	1 May 2024
Bosnia and Herzegovina	526 (FBiH) 459 (RS)	1455 (FBiH) 1290 (RS)	823 (FBiH) 687 (RS)[32][36]	• KM 1,610.00 (FBiH, gross) • KM 1344.26 (RS, gross)	KM 9.22 (FBiH) KM 7.76 (RS)	5.57 (FBiH) 4.69 (RS)	13.32 (FBiH) 11.68 (RS)	0.5111	1 Jan 2026 / 1 Jan 2025
Bulgaria	481	1055	620	€620.00	€3.74	4.37	8.19	1	1 Jan 2026
Croatia	753	1688	970	€970.00	€6.06	6.55	13.59	1	1 Jan 2025
Czech Republic	708	1393	825	20,800 Kč	124.40 Kč	5.11	9.72	0.0397	1 Jan 2025
Estonia	865	1330	946	€946.00	€5.67	5.67	8.72	1	1 Apr 2026
France	1478	2138	1867	€1,867.02	€12.31	14.24	17.81	1	1 Jun 2026
Germany	1538	2118	2111	€2,111.03 (38 h/week)	€12.82	13.85	17.66	1	1 Jan 2025
Greece	900 (12-month)	1565 (12-month)	920	€920 / €1073.33 (12-month basis)	€5.92	6.92	10.90	1	1 Apr 2026
Hungary	479/ 574 (sk.)	1063 / 1275 (sk.)	720 / 863 (sk.)	290,800 Ft / 348,800 Ft (skilled)	1,671 Ft	4.29	9.19	0.0025	1 Jan 2025
Ireland	2034	2738	2282	€2,281.50 (39 h/week)	€13.50	14.60	18.17	1	1 Jan 2025
Latvia	660	1245	780	€780.00	€4.87	5.76	10.87	1	1 Jan 2026
Lithuania	847	1563	1153	€1,153	€7.05	6.90	12.78	1	1 Jan 2026
Luxembourg	2333 / 2716 (skilled)	2726 / 3173 (skilled)	2771 / 3326 (skilled)	€2,771.33 / €3,325.59 (skilled)	€16.02 / €19.22 (skilled)	18.50 / 22.20 (skilled)	18.71 / 22.46 (skilled)	1	1 Jun 2026
Malta	961	1713	961	€961.05	€5.54	5.74	9.88	1	1 Jan 2025
Moldova	254	626	316	6,300 Lei	37.28 Lei	2.13	4.33	0.05016	1 Jan 2026
Monaco	1842	1842 (Note: Resulting PPP conversion rate (2021): ~1.000)	2008	€2,007.72	€11.88	12.94	11.88	1	1 Nov 2024
Montenegro	600 / 800 (sk.)	1587 / 2116 (sk.)	670 / 894 (sk.)	€600 (net) / €800 (skilled, net)	€3.45	3.58	9.13	1	1 Oct 2024
Netherlands	2257	2943	2437	€2,437.07 (40 h/week)	€14.06	15.28	18.33	1	1 Jan 2025
North Macedonia	396	1321	586	24,379 DEN	140.64 DEN (net)	2.63	7.63	0.0163	1 Mar 2025
Poland	848	1782	1131	4,806 zł	30.50 zł	7.56	15.48	0.2391	1 Jan 2026
Portugal	1006 (12-month)	1782 (12-month)	1132	€970 / €1,132 (12-month basis)	€6.37	7.12	11.56	1	1 Jan 2027
Romania	515	1301	827	4,325 Lei	24.50 Lei	5.10	12.39	0.192	1 Jul 2026
Russia	252	808	289	27,093 ₽	156.31 ₽	1.96	5.36	0.0107	1 Jan 2026
Serbia	551	1,352	789	64,554 DIN	371 DIN (net)	3.71	8.79	0.0085	1 Jan 2026
Slovakia	664	1227	816	€816.00	€4.69	4.86	8.67	1	1 Jan 2025
Slovenia	1000	1754	1482	€1,482	€8.52	10.18	14.94	1	1 Jan 2026
Spain	1303 (12-month)	2171 (12-month)	1500	€1,500 (12-month basis)	€10.05	11.05	16.76	1	1 Jan 2027
Ukraine	134	477	174	₴8,647	₴52.00	1.23	3.73	0.02008	1 Jan 2026
United Kingdom	2022	2122	2332	£2010.58 (38 h/week)	£12.21	15.69	13	14.16	10 Apr 2025

=== Minimum wages by country (other countries) ===
Countries that have main territories in Asia, with small or no territories in Europe:

Minimum wages by country (other countries). Currencies: local, USD, Eur, and Int$ PPP.
Country	Monthly minimum wage				Hourly rate (gross)			Exchange rate to EUR	Effective at
Country	Net (EUR)	Net (PPP)	Gross (EUR)	Local currency	Local	USD	PPP	Exchange rate to EUR	Effective at
Armenia	182	504	252	֏75,000 (net)	֏450 (net)	1.13	3.02	0.0024	1 Jan 2023
Azerbaijan	206	734	226	₼400 (gross)	₼2.31	1.36	4.66	0.5662	1 Jan 2025
Cyprus	886 / 797	1494 / 1344	1000 / 900	€1,000 (normal) / €900 (first 6 months)	€5.77	5.99	9.73	1	1 Jan 2024
Georgia	5 / 391	18 / 1282	7 (priv.) / 499 (pub.)	₾20.00 (private sector) / ₾1,460 (public sector)	₾0.12 ₾8.42	0.04 2.97	0.13 9.43	0.3415	19 Jun 1999 / 1 Jan 2025
Kazakhstan	136	440	159	₸85,000 (gross)	₸490.38	0.94	2.96	0.0019	1 Jan 2024
Turkey	554	1502	652	₺33,030.20	₺185.50	4.32	9.19	0.0271	1 Jan 2026

=== Minimum wages by country (other territories) ===
The following list includes states with limited recognition:

Minimum wages by country (other territories). Currencies: local, USD, Eur, and Int$ PPP.
Country	Monthly minimum wage				Hourly rate (gross)			Exchange rate to EUR	Effective at
Country	Net (EUR)	Net (PPP)	Gross (EUR)	Local currency	Local	USD	PPP	Exchange rate to EUR	Effective at
Kosovo	457	934	500	€500.00	€3.00	2.96	5.73	1	1 Jul 2026
Northern Cyprus	1,123	―	1,291	70,893₺	₺408.99	8.61	―	0.01822	1 Aug 2026

== Countries with no minimum wage ==
In some countries, the minimum wage has been replaced with another system designed to establish an adequate income level, such as the use of collective labour agreements. See also Guaranteed minimum income and Universal basic income.

- Austria
- Denmark
- Finland
- Iceland
- Italy
- Liechtenstein
- Norway ^{(Except for 9 selected industries.)}
- San Marino
- Sweden
- Switzerland ^{(Except the cantons of Basel-Stadt, Geneva, Jura, Neuchâtel, and Ticino)}
- Vatican City

== For comparison ==
Minimum wages for US and Canada. Currencies: local, USD, Eur, and Int$ PPP.
Country	Monthly minimum wage				Hourly rate			Exchange rate to EUR	Effective at
Country	Net (EUR)	Net (PPP)	Gross (EUR)	Local currency	Local	USD	PPP	Exchange rate to EUR	Effective at
United States	1044 (fed. avg); 1490 (mean avg)	1134 (federal) / 1619 (mean avg)	▼1157 (fed)	US$1,257 (40-hour workweek)	US$7.25 (federal rate)	7.25	7.25	0.9204	24 Jul 2009
Canada	1611 (avg.)	1656	▼1970	CA$3,077 (40-hour workweek)	CA$17.75 (federal rate)	12.59	17	0.6403	1 Apr 2025

== See also ==
- List of European Union member states by minimum wage
- List of European countries by average wage
- List of European countries by budget revenues per capita
- List of European countries by GNI (nominal) per capita
- International organisations in Europe
- List of minimum wages by country
- List of countries by GDP (nominal)
- List of countries by GDP (PPP)
- List of countries by wealth per adult
