= List of European Union member states by unemployment rate =

This is a list of European Union (EU) member states by unemployment and employment rate.

== Map ==
Map of unemployment and employment rates:

== Table ==
European Union member states. Unemployment and employment rates.
European Union member states	Unemployment rate	Employment rate	Date
Austria	6.7	77.6	August 2026
Belgium	5.9	72.8	August 2026
Bulgaria	3.5	77.0	August 2026
Croatia	4.3	74.4	August 2026
Cyprus	4.1	81.3	August 2026
Czech Republic	3.2	82.9	August 2026
Denmark	5.9	79.8	August 2026
Estonia	8.0	81.7	August 2026
Finland	10.3	76.3	August 2026
France	8.2	75.4	August 2026
Germany	4.0	81.1	August 2026
Greece	7.4	71.0	August 2026
Hungary	4.7	81.1	August 2026
(Republic of Ireland) Ireland	5.0	80.2	August 2026
Italy	6.2	67.6	August 2026
Latvia	7.3	78.2	August 2026
Lithuania	6.1	80.0	August 2026
Luxembourg	7.3	73.9	August 2026
Malta	3.4	83.6	August 2026
Netherlands	4.0	83.4	August 2026
Poland	3.4	78.8	August 2026
Portugal	5.7	79.6	August 2026
Romania	6.4	69.0	August 2026
Slovakia	5.7	78.1	August 2026
Slovenia	3.4	78.3	August 2026
Spain	10.0	72.4	August 2026
Sweden	8.7	81.8	August 2026

== See also ==
- List of European regions by unemployment rate
- List of European Union member states by minimum wage
- List of European Union member states by average wage
- Economy of the European Union
- List of European countries by budget revenues
- List of European countries by GDP (nominal) per capita
- List of European countries by GDP (PPP) per capita
- List of European countries by GNI (nominal) per capita
- List of European countries by GNI (PPP) per capita
- List of countries by GDP (nominal) per capita
- List of countries by GDP (PPP) per capita
- List of countries by GDP (nominal)
- List of countries by GDP (PPP)
