= Lists of member states of the European Union =

Density of Population in the European Union 2014 (Prior to the United Kingdom’s withdrawal from the bloc, and excluding Croatia)

These lists provide different types of information about each of the member states of the European Union, including politics, demographics and economics.

== General ==
- Member state of the European Union § List
- By political system
- By population

== Economics ==
- By GDP growth
- By average wage
- By health expense per person
- By minimum wage
- By unemployment rate

== See also ==
- List of European countries
  - By area
  - By GDP
    - By GDP per capita
    - By GDP PPP
  - By population
