= List of Asian and Pacific countries by GDP =

This is a list of Asian and Pacific countries sorted by their estimated gross domestic product (GDP) for the latest year. The estimates are based on data from the World Economic Outlook, which is released biannually by the International Monetary Fund.

All sovereign states with United Nations membership and territory in Asia or Oceania are included on the list apart from Syria due to a lack of data, North Korea which isn't a member of the IMF as well as transcontinental countries that are normally classified as part of Europe (as they are current or suspended members of the Council of Europe) or Africa (in the case of Egypt). In addition, the list includes the special administrative regions of China (Hong Kong and Macau) and Palestine, a UN observer state. All dependent territories (including those under the control of states on this list) are excluded.

The countries are further divided into subregional lists for localised comparisons. The figures provided are quoted in US dollars and are 2024 estimates unless otherwise noted.

== Asia-Pacific region ==
Country	2026 GDP billions of USD
China	$21,546.403
Japan	$4,341.986
India	$4,060.207
South Korea	$2,245.847
Australia	$2,110.657
Indonesia	$1,479.954
Saudi Arabia	$1,343.346
Taiwan	$1,019.596
Israel	$746.982
Singapore	$667.889
United Arab Emirates	$661.018
Thailand	$599.115
Malaysia	$547.100
Vietnam	$542.103
Bangladesh	$506.357
Philippines	$501.692
Hong Kong	$455.156
Pakistan	$450.134
Kazakhstan	$379.921
Iran	$311.950
New Zealand	$273.395
Iraq	$245.234
Qatar	$203.044
Uzbekistan	$178.167
Kuwait	$146.911
Oman	$121.397
Sri Lanka	$110.680
Myanmar	$83.172
Turkmenistan	$83.000
Jordan	$64.880
Macau	$54.656
Cambodia	$54.180
Bahrain	$46.018
Nepal	$45.593
Papua New Guinea	$36.296
Lebanon	$34.494 (Note: 2025 estimate)
Mongolia	$31.131
Kyrgyzstan	$26,687
Tajikistan	$21.114
Afghanistan	$19.711 (Note: 2025 estimate)
West Bank and Gaza	$17.167 (Note: 2025 estimate)
Brunei	$18.873
Laos	$18.388
Yemen	$10.982
Maldives	$8.148
Fiji	$6.568
Bhutan	$3.909
Timor-Leste	$2.170
Solomon Islands	$1.866
Vanuatu	$1.386
Samoa	$1.347
Tonga	$0.727
Micronesia	$0.531
Kiribati	$0.402
Palau	$0.373
Marshall Islands	$0.338
Nauru	$0.196
Tuvalu	$0.083
Total	$46,490.624

== East Asia ==
Country	2024 GDP billions of USD
China	$18,748
Japan	$4,026
South Korea	$1,870
Taiwan	$782.4
Hong Kong	$407.1
Macau	$50.18
Mongolia	$23.59
Total	$25,907

== South Asia ==
Country	2024 GDP billions of USD
India	$3,909
Bangladesh	$451.1
Pakistan	$373.1
Sri Lanka	$98.96
Nepal	$43.42
Afghanistan	$17.25 (Note: 2023 estimate)
Maldives	$7.02
Bhutan	$3.09
Total	$4,903

== Southeast Asia ==
Country	2024 GDP billions of USD
Indonesia	$1,396
Singapore	$547.4
Thailand	$526.4
Philippines	$461.6
Vietnam	$459.5
Malaysia	$419.6
Myanmar	$61.18
Cambodia	$47.33
Laos	$15.88
Brunei	$15.46
Timor-Leste	$2.02
Total	$3,533

== Middle East / West Asia ==
Country	2026 GDP billions of USD
Saudi Arabia	$1,389
Israel	$719.85
United Arab Emirates	$621.55
Iran	$300.29
Iraq	$264.78
Qatar	$217.42
Kuwait	$172.92
Oman	$117.18
Jordan	$64.91
Bahrain	$48.85
Lebanon	$34.50
Yemen	$7.43
Palestine	$13.71 (Note: 2026 estimate)
Total	$3,894

== Oceania / Pacific ==
Country	2024 GDP billions of USD
Australia	$1,797
New Zealand	$257.7
Papua New Guinea	$31.65
Fiji	$5.95
Solomon Islands	$1.78
Vanuatu	$1.21
Samoa	$1.07
Tonga	$0.539
Micronesia	$0.471
Marshall Islands	$0.280
Kiribati	$0.308
Palau	$0.306
Nauru	$0.161
Tuvalu	$0.065
Total	$2,098

== Central Asia ==
Country	2024 GDP billions of USD
Kazakhstan	$284.8
Uzbekistan	$115.0
Turkmenistan	$82.52
Kyrgyzstan	$17.49
Tajikistan	$13.54
Total	$513.3

== See also ==
- List of ASEAN country subdivisions by GDP
- Economy of Asia
- World economy
