= Parliamentary group =

Group of members of different political parties

A parliamentary group, parliamentary caucus or political group is a group consisting of members of different political parties or independent politicians with similar ideologies. Some parliamentary systems allow smaller political parties, who are not numerous enough to form parliamentary groups in their own names, to join with other parties or independent politicians in order to benefit from rights or privileges that are only accorded to formally recognized groups. An electoral alliance, where political parties associate only for elections, is similar to a parliamentary group. A technical group is similar to a parliamentary group but with members of differing ideologies. In contrast, a political faction is a subgroup within a political party and a coalition forms only after elections.

Parliamentary groups may elect a parliamentary leader; such leaders are often important political players. Parliamentary groups in some cases use party discipline to control the votes of their members.

== International terms ==
Parliamentary groups correspond to "caucuses" in the United States Congress and the Parliament of Canada. A parliamentary group is sometimes called the parliamentary wing of a party, as distinct from its organizational wing. Equivalent terms are used in different countries, including: Argentina (bloque and interbloque), Australia (party room); Austria (Klub); Belgium (fractie/fraction/Fraktion); Brazil and Portugal ("grupo parlamentar" or, informally, "bancadas"); Germany (Fraktion); Italy (gruppo), Finland (eduskuntaryhmä/riksdagsgrupp); the Netherlands (fractie); Poland (klub), Switzerland (fraction/Fraktion/frazione); Romania (grup parlamentar); and Russia (фракция/fraktsiya), Spain ('grupo parlamentario'), and Ukraine (фракція/fraktsiya). In some countries, there is a special category for groupings who do not full fill the criteria for a group: Germany (Parlamentarische Gruppe); Italy (componente), and Poland (koło).

== Relationship with party ==
Generally, parliamentary groups have some independence from the wider party organisations. It is often thought improper for elected MPs to take instructions solely from non-elected party officials or from the small subset of the electorate represented by party members. In any case, the exigencies of government, the need to cooperate with other members of the legislature and the desire to retain the support of the electorate as a whole often preclude strict adherence to the wider party's wishes. The exact relationship between the parliamentary party and the party varies between countries, and also from party to party. For example, in some parties, the parliamentary and organisational leadership will be held by the same person or people, whether ex officio or not; other parties maintain a sharp distinction between the two offices. Nevertheless, in almost all cases, the parliamentary leader is the public face of the party, and wields considerable influence within the organisational wing, whether or not they hold any official position there.

== Leadership ==
A parliamentary group is typically led by a parliamentary group leader or chairperson, though some parliamentary groups have two or more co-leaders. If the parliamentary group is represented in the legislature, the leader is almost always chosen from among the sitting members; if the leader does not yet have a seat in the legislature, a sitting member of the group may be expected to resign to make way for him or her. If the party is not represented in the legislature for the time being, the leader will often be put forward at a general election as the party's candidate for their most winnable seat. In some parties, the leader is elected solely by the members of the parliamentary group; in others, some or all members of the wider party participate in the election. Parliamentary groups often have one or more whips, whose role is to support the leadership by enforcing party discipline.

== Examples ==
=== Armenia ===
In Armenia, political parties often form parliamentary groups before running in elections. Prior to the 2021 Armenian parliamentary elections, four different parliamentary groups were formed. A parliamentary group must pass the 7% electoral threshold in order to gain representation in the National Assembly.

=== Czech Republic ===
Higher electoral thresholds for parliamentary groups discourages the formation of parliamentary groups running in elections.

=== European Union ===
The parliamentary groups of the European Parliament must consist of no less than 25 MEPs from seven different EU member states. No party discipline is required. Parliamentary groups gain financial support and can join committees.

=== Hungary ===
Hungarian mixed-member majoritarian representation rewards the formation of parliamentary groups, like United for Hungary.

=== Italy ===
Italian parallel voting system rewards the formation of parliamentary groups like Centre-right coalition and Centre-left coalition.

=== Switzerland ===
In the Swiss Federal Assembly, at least five members are required to form a parliamentary group. The most important task is to delegate members to the commissions. The parliamentary groups are decisive in Swiss Federal Assembly and not the political parties, which are not mentioned in the parliamentary law.

=== United Kingdom ===
Conservative Party
Conservative Private Members' Committee (1922 Committee)
Labour Party
Parliamentary Labour Party

==== All-party parliamentary groups ====
In the United Kingdom Parliament there exist associations of MPs called "all-party parliamentary groups", which bring together members of different parliamentary groups who wish to involve themselves with a particular subject. This term is in a sense the opposite of the term 'parliamentary group', which designates a group that includes only members of the same party or electoral fusion.

== Parliamentary Friendship Groups ==
One special kind of parliamentary groups are the Parliamentary Friendship Groups, also called Inter-Parliamentary Friendship Groups, Friendship Parliamentary Groups, or Parliamentary Group of Friendship [and Cooperation].

"Parliamentary Friendship" groups are groups of congresspeople/members of parliament who voluntarily organise themselves to promote parliamentary relations between their own Parliament and another country's (or even a region's group of countries') parliament(s), and, in a broader scope, to foster the bilateral relations between said countries. Parliamentary friendship groups play an important role in New Zealand's engagement in inter-parliamentary relations, with group members often called upon to participate and host meetings for visiting delegations from the other part, as well as often being invited by the other country's parliament to visit it.

Friendship Groups do not speak for the Government of their own country, or even for the whole of the Parliament/Congress to which they belong, as they are usually self-regulating and self-fulfilling.

Parliamentary Friendship Groups are active in the national congresses/parliaments of countries such as Armenia, Australia, Brazil, Canada, Germany, Israel, Laos, New Zealand, Pakistan, Peru, Romania, Serbia, Slovenia, South Korea, Switzerland, and the United States, among many others.

== See also ==
- Caucus
- Coalition
- Political faction
- Political organisation
