= List of European Union member states by minimum wage =

The following list provides information relating to the (gross) minimum wages (before tax & social charges) of in the European Union member states.

The calculations are based on the assumption of a 40-hour working week and a 52-week year, with the exceptions of France (35 hours), Belgium (38 hours), Ireland (39 hours), and Germany (39.1 hours).

Most of EU countries minimum wages are fixed at a monthly rate, but there are some countries where minimum wage is fixed at an hourly rate or a weekly rate.

European countries on the gross minimum wage before tax and social charges:

Countries marked on the map in green have a minimum wage above €2000, in blue in the range from €1000 to €2000, in orange from €800 to €1000, in red below €800. Countries marked on the map in purple do not have a minimum wage.

== Minimum wages by European Union member states ==
EU member state	Monthly minimum gross wage (NCU)	Monthly net minimum wage (EUR)	Monthly gross minimum wage (EUR)	Hourly rate	Effective per
Belgium	€2,189.81 euros	-	€2,189.81	€13.30	1 April 2026
Bulgaria	€620.00 (minimum wage is fixed at an hourly rate)	€481.27	€620.20	€3.74	1 January 2026
Croatia	€1,130.00	€843.90	€1,130.00	€7.06	1 January 2027
Cyprus	€1,088.00 (€979 for the first 6 months of employment)	€866.90/€963.42.	€979.00/ €1,088.00	-	1 January 2026
Czech Republic	22,400.00 koruna (minimum wage is fixed at an hourly rate and at a monthly rate simultaneously)	782.36€ (19,012 koruna)	€921.72	5.53€ (134.4 koruna)	1 January 2026
Estonia	€946.00 (minimum wage is fixed at an hourly rate and at a monthly rate simultaneously)	€880.07	€946.00	€5.67	1 April 2026
France	€1,867.02 (minimum wage is fixed at an hourly rate)	€1,426.30	€1,867.02	€11.65	1 June 2026
Germany	€2,343 (minimum wage is fixed at an hourly rate)	€1,514.00	€2,343.00	€12.82	1 January 2026
Greece	€1,073.33 (€920 in 14 payments)	€900.28	€1,073.33	€6.44	1 April 2026
Hungary	322,800 Ft (basic) / 373,200 Ft (skilled employees)	552.22 / 638.44€	€844.28 / €976.10	1,106 Ft / 1,211 Ft	1 January 2026
(Republic of Ireland) Ireland	€2,391.35 (minimum wage is fixed at an hourly rate)	€2,112.25	€2,391.35	€14.15	1 January 2026
Latvia	€780.00	€660.46	€780.00	€4.09	1 January 2026
Lithuania	€1,245.00	€902	€1,245.00	€7,61	1 January 2027
Luxembourg	€2,703.74 (unskilled workers) / €3,244.48 (skilled workers) - (minimum wage is fixed at an hourly rate and at a monthly rate simultaneously)	€2,363.07 (unskilled workers) / €2,833.78 (skilled workers)	€2,703.74 / €3,244.48	€15.63 / €18.75	1 January 2026
Malta	€994.00 (minimum wage is fixed at a weekly rate)	€871.00	€994.00	€5.54	1 January 2026
Netherlands	€2,549.73 (minimum wage is fixed at an hourly rate)	€2,323.62	€2,549.73	€14.71	1 January 2026
Poland	4,806 złoty	€857.34	€1,143.61	€7.20	1 January 2026
Portugal	€1,073.33 (€920 in 14 payments)	€888.7	€1,073.33	€6.20	1 January 2026
Romania	4,325 lei	€510.50	€849.53	€4.64	1 July 2026
Slovakia	€915.00 (minimum wage is fixed at an hourly rate and at a monthly rate simultaneously)	€663.50	€915.00	€4.33	1 January 2026
Slovenia	€1,481.88	€1,000.04	€1,481.88	€8.52	1 January 2026
Spain	€1,424.50 (€1,221 in 14 payments)	€1,035.00	€1,424.50	€7.82	1 January 2026

== EU member states with no minimum wage ==
- Austria
- Denmark
- Finland
- Sweden
- Italy

== See also ==
- List of European countries by minimum wage (Gross/Net)
- List of European Union member states by unemployment rate
- Economy of the European Union
- List of European countries by average wage
- List of sovereign states in Europe by budget revenues per capita
- List of sovereign states in Europe by GNI (nominal) per capita
- List of countries by GDP (nominal)
- List of countries by GDP (PPP)
