= List of African countries by Human Development Index =

The Human Development Index (HDI) is a summary measure of average achievement in key dimensions of human development: a long and healthy life, knowledge, and a decent standard of living. It is a standard means of measuring well-being. It is used to distinguish whether the country is a developed, developing, or underdeveloped country, and also to measure the impact of economic policies on quality of life. Countries fall into four broad categories based on their HDI: very high, high, medium, and low human development. Currently, Seychelles and Mauritius are the only African countries that fall into the very high human development category. South Sudan has the lowest HDI in both Africa and the world according to the list.

== List ==
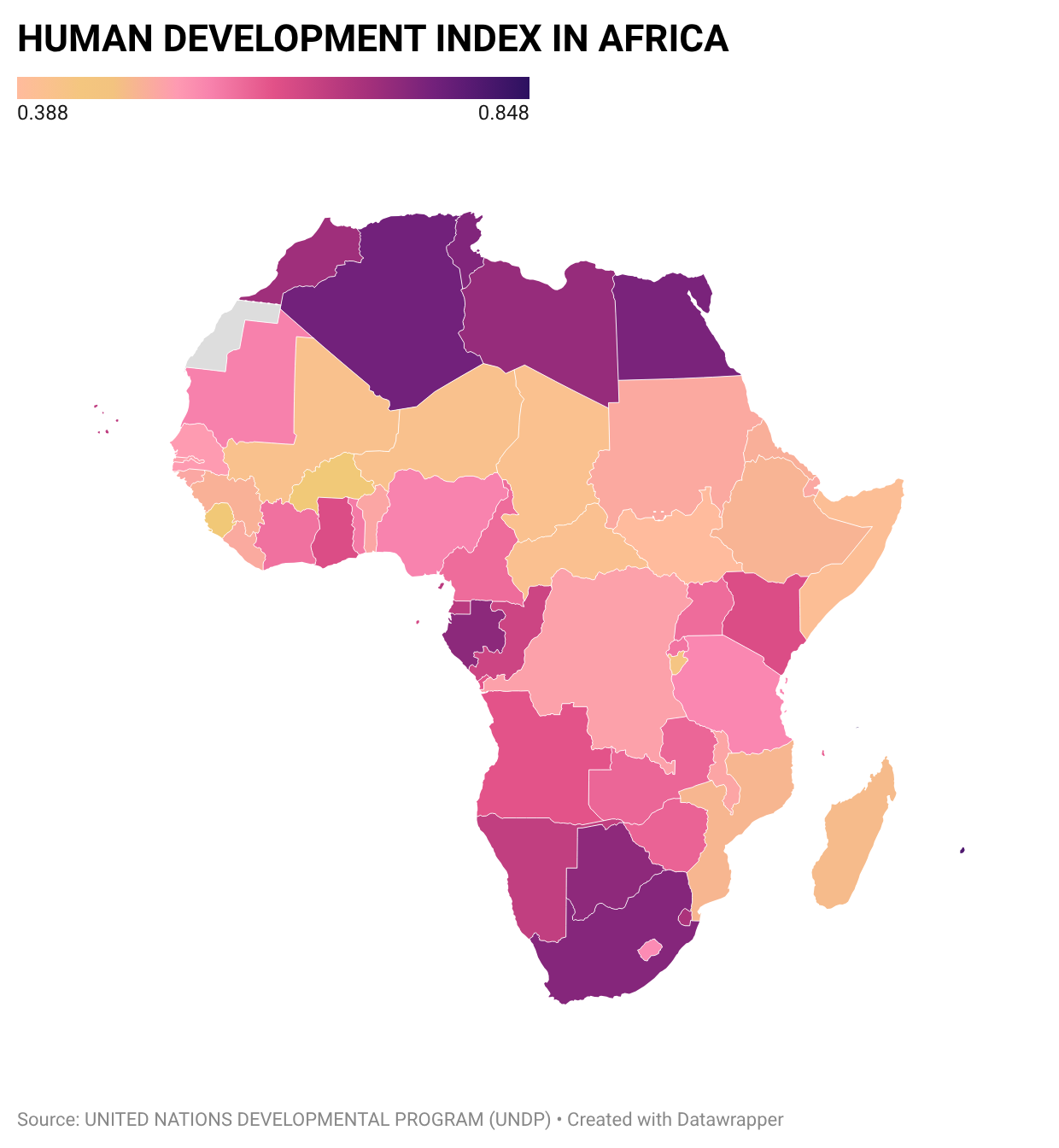
Human Development Index in Africa

The table below presents the latest Human Development Index (HDI) for countries in Africa as included in the United Nations Development Programme's Human Development Report, released on 5 May 2025 and based on data collected in 2023.

As of 2025, all African UN member states are included in the report. Several dependent territories administered by non-African states are not ranked as they are not included in the latest report. Additionally, the borders and autonomy of Western Sahara are contested so an accurate HDI cannot be determined.

List of African countries by Human Development Index
Rank		Country	Human Development Index (HDI)	
Region	World	Country	2023 data (2025 report)	Change in HDI value 2024-2025
Very High Human Development
1	54	Seychelles	0.848	▲0.046
2	73	Mauritius	0.806	▲0.010
High Human Development
3	96	Algeria	0.763	▲0.018
4	100	Egypt	0.754	▲0.026
5	105	Tunisia	0.746	▲0.014
6	106	South Africa	0.741	▲0.024
7	108	Gabon	0.733	▲0.040
8	111	Botswana	0.731	▲0.024
9	115	Libya	0.721	▼0.025
10	120	Morocco	0.710	▲0.012
Medium Human Development
11	126	Eswatini	0.695	▲0.085
12	133	Equatorial Guinea	0.674	▲0.024
13	135	Cape Verde	0.668	▲0.007
14	136	Namibia	0.665	▲0.055
15	138	Republic of the Congo	0.649	▲0.056
16	141	São Tomé and Príncipe	0.637	▲0.024
17	143	Ghana	0.628	▲0.026
17	143	Kenya	0.628	▲0.027
19	148	Angola	0.616	▲0.025
20	150	Comoros	0.603	▲0.017
21	153	Zimbabwe	0.598	▲0.048
22	154	Zambia	0.595	▲0.026
23	155	Cameroon	0.588	▲0.001
24	157	Ivory Coast	0.582	▲0.048
24	157	Uganda	0.582	▲0.032
26	159	Rwanda	0.578	▲0.030
27	161	Togo	0.571	▲0.024
28	163	Mauritania	0.563	▲0.029
29	166	Nigeria	0.560	▲0.012
30	165	Tanzania	0.555	▲0.023
31	167	Lesotho	0.550	▲0.029
Low Human Development
32	169	Senegal	0.530	▲0.013
33	170	Gambia	0.524	▲0.029
34	171	Democratic Republic of the Congo	0.522	▲0.048
35	172	Malawi	0.517	▲0.011
36	173	Benin	0.515	▲0.011
37	174	Guinea-Bissau	0.514	▲0.031
38	175	Djibouti	0.513	▼0.002
39	176	Sudan	0.511	▼0.005
40	177	Liberia	0.510	▲0.023
41	178	Eritrea	0.503	▲0.010
42	179	Guinea	0.500	▲0.028
43	180	Ethiopia	0.497	▲0.005
44	182	Mozambique	0.493	▲0.032
45	183	Madagascar	0.487	Steady
46	185	Sierra Leone	0.467	▲0.009
47	186	Burkina Faso	0.459	▲0.021
48	187	Burundi	0.439	▲0.019
49	188	Mali	0.419	▲0.009
49	188	Niger	0.419	▲0.005
51	190	Chad	0.416	▲0.022
52	191	Central African Republic	0.414	▲0.027
53	192	Somalia	0.404	▲0.024
54	193	South Sudan	0.388	▲0.007

== Notes ==
1.Data for Somalia only dates back to 2022.

== See also ==
- List of African countries by GDP (nominal)
- List of African countries by GDP (PPP)
- List of African countries by GDP (PPP) per capita
- List of African countries by population
- List of countries by Human Development Index
- List of countries by Human Development Index by region
- List of countries by percentage of population living in poverty
- Poverty in Africa
