= List of African countries by GDP (PPP) per capita =

This is a list of African countries by gross domestic product (GDP) per capita based on purchasing power parity (PPP). GDP (PPP) per capita is given in international dollars.

Note that the list does not include Mayotte and Réunion, which are both geographically part of Africa but politically overseas departments and regions of France. Additionally, Eritrea is excluded from the list due to a lack of recent data.

== List ==
Rank	Country	2026 GDP (PPP) per capita
1	Seychelles	$35,855
2	Mauritius	$34,830
3	Gabon	$25,847
4	Egypt	$23,321
5	Botswana	$22,039
6	Equatorial Guinea	$19,061
7	Algeria	$19,677
8	Libya	$18,749
9	South Africa	$16,740
10	Tunisia	$15,833
11	Eswatini	$14,244
12	Cabo Verde	$13,313
13	Namibia	$12,666
14	Morocco	$12,336
15	Angola	$10,446
16	Djibouti	$10,166
17	Nigeria	$9,994
18	Mauritania	$9,280
19	Ghana	$9,116
20	Côte d'Ivoire	$8,672
21	Zimbabwe	$8,443
22	Kenya	$8,020
23	São Tomé and Príncipe	$6,711
24	Republic of Congo	$6,712
25	Cameroon	$5,993
26	Senegal	$5,565
27	Guinea	$5,177
28	Benin	$5,088
29	Zambia	$4,572
30	Ethiopia	$4,974
31	Tanzania	$4,607
32	Comoros	$4,222
33	Rwanda	$4,523
34	Uganda	$4,192
35	The Gambia	$3,865
36	Sierra Leone	$3,909
37	Togo	$3,757
38	Lesotho	$3,300
39	Guinea-Bissau	$3,405
40	Chad	$3,458
41	Burkina Faso	$3,227
42	Mali	$3,665
43	Sudan	$2,451
44	Niger	$2,232
45	Madagascar	$2,106
46	Liberia	$2,095
47	Somalia	$1,956
48	Democratic Republic of the Congo	$2,144
49	Malawi	$1,797
50	Mozambique	$1,699
51	South Sudan	$1,540
52	Central African Republic	$1,468
53	Burundi	$1,031

== See also ==
- List of African countries by GDP (nominal)
- List of countries by GDP (PPP) per capita
