= List of countries in Asia and Oceania by Human Development Index =

HDI ranking
- UNHDI Source: "Human Development Report 2023". United Nations Development Programme.
- HDI scale ranges: Very high · High · Medium · Low
- Number of countries: 48
- Cut-off for very high HDI: ≥ 0.800

The Human Development Index (HDI) is a comparative measure of life expectancy, literacy, education and standards of living for countries worldwide. It is a standard means of measuring well-being, especially child welfare. It is used to distinguish whether the country is a developed, a developing or an under-developed country, and also to measure the impact of economic policies on quality of life. The index was developed in 1990 by Pakistani economist Mahbub ul Haq. Countries fall into four broad categories based on their HDI: (very high, high, medium, and low human development). Currently, no Oceanian country falls into the low human development category, while Afghanistan, Pakistan and Yemen are the only Asian countries which fall into this category.

The table below presents the latest Human Development Index (HDI) for countries in Asia and the Pacific as included in a Development report of united nations development programme released on 6 May 2025 and based on data collected in 2023.

Countries with contiguous boundaries that are partially (but not entirely) located in Asia are shown here in italics, but HDI figures are given for the whole country. Macau, North Korea, and Taiwan in Asia, are not ranked as they are not included in the latest report by the United Nations Development Programme. As of 2025, Taiwan ranked very Highly in HDI with 0.926 per official figures.

List of countries in Asia and Oceania by Human Development Index
Rank		Nation	Human Development Index (HDI)			
Region	World	Nation	HDI 2023	HDI 2022	HDI 2021	Change in HDI Value (2021-2023)
Very High Human Development
1	7	Australia	0.958	0.952	0.954	▲0.004
2	8	Hong Kong, China (SAR) (Note: Hong Kong is a special administrative region of China.)	0.955	0.950	0.961	▼0.006
3	13	Singapore	0.946	0.942	0.948	▼0.002
4	15	United Arab Emirates	0.940	0.921	0.903	▲0.037
5	17	New Zealand	0.938	0.933	0.939	▼0.001
6	20	South Korea	0.937	0.928	0.933	▲0.004
7	23	Japan	0.925	0.921	0.922	▲0.003
8	27	Israel	0.919	0.921	0.918	▲0.001
9	32	Cyprus (Note: Cyprus is geographically a part of Western Asia (or the Middle East), though politically and culturally it is often considered as being a part of Europe.)	0.913	0.908	0.907	▲0.006
10	37	Saudi Arabia	0.900	0.893	0.878	▲0.022
11	38	Bahrain	0.899	0.902	0.885	▲0.014
12	43	Qatar	0.886	0.883	0.866	▲0.020
13	50	Oman	0.858	0.846	0.834	▲0.024
14	51	Turkey (Note: A portion of Turkey, known as East Thrace, is a part of Europe, making up about 3% of the country's land area and 14% of its population.)	0.853	0.853	0.841	▲0.012
15	52	Kuwait	0.852	0.845	0.839	▲0.013
16	57	Georgia (Note: The municipality of Kazbegi is located in Europe, which makes up about 0.1% of Georgia's population.)	0.844	0.838	0.819	▲0.025
17	60	Brunei	0.837	0.825	0.835	▲0.002
18	60	Kazakhstan (Note: Two regions of Kazakhstan, namely Atyrau and West Kazakhstan, are partly located in Europe.)	0.837	0.831	0.816	▲0.021
19	64	Russia (Note: Russia is geographically a transcontinental country, though culturally and politically it is often considered as being a part of Europe. Asian Russia consists of over 75% of the country's territory, but only 22% of its population.)	0.832	0.826	0.813	▲0.018
20	67	Malaysia	0.819	0.810	0.802	▲0.017
21	69	Armenia (Note: Armenia is geographically a part of Western Asia (or the Middle East), though culturally and politically it is often considered as being a part of Europe.)	0.811	0.891	0.786	▲0.025
High Human Development
22	75	Iran	0.799	0.793	0.777	▲0.022
23	76	Thailand	0.798	0.792	0.800	▼0.002
24	78	China (Note: Data for China are calculated for mainland China only, excluding Taiwan and the special administrative regions of Hong Kong and Macao.)	0.797	0.796	0.794	▲0.003
25	81	Azerbaijan (Note: The districts of Khachmaz, Quba, Qusar, Shabran, and Siazan are geographically in Europe, placing about 5% of Azerbaijan's population in Europe.)	0.789	0.784	0.765	▲0.024
26	84	Palau	0.786	0.786	0.789	▼0.003
27	89	Sri Lanka	0.776	0.777	0.777	▼0.001
28	92	Tonga	0.769	0.764	0.763	▲0.006
29	93	Maldives	0.766	0.764	0.745	▲0.021
30	93	Vietnam	0.766	0.764	0.754	▲0.012
31	95	Turkmenistan	0.764	0.761	0.754	▲0.010
32	100	Jordan	0.754	0.751	0.736	▲0.018
33	100	Egypt (Note: The portion of Egypt located in Asia is the Sinai Region, comprising about 6% of the country's landmass. However, the country is politically a part of Africa.)	0.754	0.751	0.738	▲0.016
34	102	Lebanon	0.752	0.755	0.733	▲0.019
35	104	Mongolia	0.747	0.742	0.727	▲0.020
36	107	Uzbekistan	0.740	0.737	0.727	▲0.013
37	108	Marshall Islands	0.733	0.732	0.723	▲0.010
38	111	Fiji	0.731	0.726	0.705	▲0.026
39	113	Indonesia (Note: The Aru Islands and Western New Guinea are geographically in Oceania, comprising approx. 22% of Indonesia's landmass and 2% of its population. However, the country is politically a part of Asia.)	0.728	0.726	0.707	▲0.021
40	117	Philippines	0.720	0.714	0.690	▲0.030
41	117	Kyrgyzstan	0.720	0.717	0.704	▲0.016
42	122	Samoa	0.708	0.703	0.706	▲0.002
43	122	Nauru	0.703	0.700	0.692	▲0.011
Medium Human Development
44	125	Bhutan	0.698	0.695	0.691	▲0.007
45	126	Iraq	0.695	0.695	0.687	▲0.008
46	128	Tajikistan	0.691	0.687	0.672	▲0.019
47	129	Tuvalu	0.689	0.686	0.681	▲0.008
48	130	Bangladesh	0.685	0.680	0.663	▲0.022
49	130	India	0.685	0.676	0.647	▲0.038
50	133	Palestine	0.674	0.733	0.718	▼0.044
51	140	Kiribati	0.644	0.642	0.631	▲0.013
52	142	Timor Leste	0.634	0.633	0.644	▼0.010
53	145	Nepal	0.622	0.605	0.596	▲0.026
54	146	Vanuatu	0.621	0.621	0.615	▲0.006
55	147	Laos	0.617	0.614	0.613	▲0.003
56	149	Micronesia	0.615	0.614	0.611	▲0.004
57	150	Myanmar	0.609	0.606	0.605	▲0.003
58	151	Cambodia	0.606	0.602	0.594	▲0.012
59	156	Solomon Islands	0.584	0.583	0.577	▲0.007
60	160	Papua New Guinea	0.576	0.572	0.567	▲0.009
61	162	Syria	0.564	0.571	0.571	▼0.007
Low Human Development
62	168	Pakistan	0.544	0.544	0.537	▲0.007
63	181	Afghanistan	0.496	0.495	0.486	▲0.010
64	184	Yemen	0.470	0.466	0.458	▲0.012

== See also ==
- Asia-Pacific Economic Cooperation
- List of Asian and Pacific countries by GDP (PPP)
- List of Asian countries by GDP
- List of Asian countries by population
- List of countries by Human Development Index
- List of countries by Human Development Index by region
- List of countries by industrial production growth rate
- List of countries by percentage of population living in poverty
