= List of sovereign states in Europe by GNI (PPP) per capita =

This is map and list of European countries by Gross national income (PPP) per capita for year 2023 from World Bank. Countries in green have more than $32,000, yellow $18,000-$32,000 and red below $18,000 GDP (PPP) per capita

State (Note: Only 51 sovereign states are listed, including Kosovo and Vatican which are not UN members)	GNI (PPP) per capita
Albania	21,110
Andorra	75,090 (2022)
Armenia	22,440
Austria	58,940
Azerbaijan	22,640
Belarus	29,640
Belgium	71,990
Bosnia and Herzegovina	22,790
Bulgaria	37,380
Croatia	45,950
Cyprus	51,330
Czech Republic	51,370
Denmark	79,390
Estonia	47,350
Finland	64,950
France	62,130
Georgia	23,040
Germany	72,110
Greece	40,880
Hungary	44,650
Iceland	79,290
Ireland	98,650
Italy	58,650
Kazakhstan	35,420
Kosovo	15,310
Latvia	41,420
Liechtenstein	N/D
Lithuania	50,100
Luxembourg	98,490
Malta	56,800
Moldova	17,600
Monaco	N/D
Montenegro	31,520
Netherlands	77,750
North Macedonia	23,510
Norway	108,790
Poland	47,380
Portugal	47,850
Romania	46,620
Russia	43,510
San Marino	59,020 (2021)
Serbia	25,880
Slovakia	43,500
Slovenia	54,130
Spain	52,420
Sweden	72,990
Switzerland	90,080
Turkey	43,700
Ukraine	18,560
United Kingdom	58,160
Vatican City	N/D

== See also ==
- List of European countries by membership in international organisations
- List of sovereign states in Europe by budget revenues
- List of sovereign states in Europe by budget revenues per capita
- List of sovereign states in Europe by GDP (nominal) per capita
- List of European countries by Real GDP per capita
- List of sovereign states in Europe by GDP (PPP) per capita
- List of sovereign states in Europe by GNI (nominal) per capita
- List of countries by average wage
- List of countries by GDP (nominal) per capita
- List of countries by GDP (nominal)
- List of countries by GDP (PPP)
- List of countries by GNI (PPP) per capita
