= List of African countries by GDP (PPP) =

This is a list of the African nations ranked by Gross Domestic Product (GDP) at Purchasing Power Parity (PPP). Figures are given in international dollars according to the International Monetary Fund.

The GDP (PPP) of the dependent or integral territories of France, Italy, Malta, Portugal, Spain, the United Kingdom and Yemen within the African continent are not included in this list. For the purpose of the data published by the International Monetary Fund, the GDP (PPP) of Zanzibar is included as part of that of Tanzania, the GDP (PPP) of Western Sahara is included as part of that of Morocco, and the GDP (PPP) of Somaliland is included as part of that of Somalia.

== GDP (PPP) ==
Country	GDP (PPP)	GDP per capita	Peak year
Africa	12,663.816	8,416.16	2026
Egypt	2,600.028	23,624.16	2026
Nigeria	2,438.180	10,051.14	2026
South Africa	1,075.434	16,840.97	2026
Algeria	947.065	19,718.89	2026
Ethiopia	561.348	4,995.55	2026
Morocco	472.789	12,425.47	2026
Kenya	436.129	8,036.42	2026
Angola	434.764	10,712.63	2026
Ghana	329.911	9,241.83	2026
Tanzania	322.693	4,447.03	2026
Côte d'Ivoire	294.178	8,693.68	2026
Democratic Republic of the Congo	235.277	2,138.50	2026
Uganda	206.676	4,157.97	2026
Tunisia	198.912	16,021.72	2026
Sudan	197.404	5,306.24	2020
Libya	196.456	30,928.90	2010
Cameroon	184.920	6,034.14	2026
Zimbabwe	150.672	8,443.16	2026
Guinea	129.755	5,177.02	2026
Zambia	104.733	4,650.27	2026
Senegal	103.416	5,393.82	2025
Mali	95.793	3,684.31	2026
Burkina Faso	79.822	3,241.22	2026
Benin	78.912	5,180.62	2026
Madagascar	68.658	2,124.41	2026
Niger	67.419	2,232.14	2026
Chad	67.405	3,458.27	2026
Rwanda	65.461	4,523.57	2026
Mozambique	62.578	1,699.31	2026
Botswana	47.262	19,286.91	2022
Gabon	38.574	17,848.29	2022
Malawi	35.409	1,602.74	2022
Mauritius	31.720	25,043.15	2022
Mauritania	29.993	6,920.23	2022
Equatorial Guinea	28.522	19,036.45	2022
Namibia	27.118	10,448.11	2022
Togo	22.612	2,599.14	2022
Republic of the Congo	22.519	4,578.15	2022
Somalia	20.641	1,321.96	2022
Sierra Leone	16.277	1,957.58	2022
South Sudan	13.533	927.54	2022
Eswatini	11.985	10,411.31	2022
Burundi	10.779	855.61	2022
Liberia	8.776	1,779.37	2022
Eritrea	7.695	2,101.43	2022
The Gambia	6.792	2,645.76	2022
Djibouti	6.774	6,666.77	2022
Lesotho	6.408	3,033.98	2022
Central African Republic	5.528	1,101.77	2022
Guinea-Bissau	5.279	2,783.97	2022
Cape Verde	4.413	7,739.92	2022
Seychelles	3.489	35,272.28	2022
Comoros	3.206	3,355.31	2022
São Tomé and Príncipe	1.063	4,681.44	2022

== See also ==
- List of African countries by GDP (nominal)
- List of African countries by Human Development Index
- Economy of Africa
