= List of countries by Human Development Index =

World map of countries or territories by Human Development Index scores in increments of 0.050 (based on 2023 data, published in 2025): ≥ 0.950; 0.900–0.950; 0.850–0.899; 0.800–0.849; 0.750–0.799; 0.700–0.749; 0.650–0.699; 0.600–0.649; 0.550–0.599; 0.500–0.549; 0.450–0.499; 0.400–0.449; ≤ 0.399; Data unavailable

The Human Development Index (HDI) is the most widely used indicator of human development and has changed how people view the concept. However, several aspects of the index have received criticism. Some scholars have criticized how the factors are weighed, in particular how an additional year of life expectancy is valued differently between countries; and the limited factors it considers, noting the omission of factors such as the levels of distributional and gender inequality. In response to the former, the UNDP introduced the inequality-adjusted Human Development Index (IHDI) in its 2010 report, and in response to the latter the Gender Development Index (GDI) was introduced in the 1995 report. Others have criticized the perceived oversimplification of using a single number per country.

To reflect developmental differences within countries, a subnational HDI (SHDI) featuring data for more than 1,600 regions was introduced in 2018 by the Global Data Lab at Radboud University in the Netherlands. In 2020, the UNDP introduced another index, the planetary pressures–adjusted Human Development Index (PHDI), which decreases the scores of countries with a higher ecological footprint.

== Dimensions and indicators ==
The HDI was first published in 1990 with the goal of being a more comprehensive measure of human development than purely economic measures such as gross domestic product. The index incorporates three dimensions of human development: a long and healthy life, knowledge, and decent living standards. Various indicators are used to quantify how countries perform on each dimension. The indicators used in the 2022 report were life expectancy at birth; expected years of schooling for children; mean years of schooling for adults; and gross national income per capita. The indicators are used to create a health index, an education index and an income index, each with a value between 0 and 1. The geometric mean of the three indices—that is, the cube root of the product of the indices—is the human development index. A value above 0.800 is classified as very high, between 0.700 and 0.799 as high, 0.550 to 0.699 as medium, and below 0.550 as low.

The data used to calculate HDI comes mostly from United Nations agencies and international institutions, such as United Nations Educational, Scientific and Cultural Organization (UNESCO), United Nations Department of Economic and Social Affairs, the World Bank, International Monetary Fund and Organisation for Economic Co-operation and Development (OECD). Rarely, when one of the indicators is missing, cross-country regression models are used. Due to improved data and methodology updates, HDI values are not comparable across human development reports; instead, each report recalculates the HDI for some previous years.

Average annual HDI growth from 2010 to 2023 published in 2025: ≥ 1.4%; 1.2%–1.4%; 1.0%–1.2%; 0.8%–1.0%; 0.6%–0.8%; 0.4%–0.6%; 0.2%–0.4%; 0.0%–0.2%; −0.5%–0.0%; −1.0%–−0.5%; < −1.0%; No data

HDI dimensions and indicators
| Dimensions | Indicators | Dimension index |
|---|---|---|
| Long and healthy life | Life expectancy at birth | Life expectancy index |
| Knowledge | Expected years of schooling Mean years of schooling | Education index |
| A decent standard of living | GNI per capita (PPP $) | GNI index |

== List ==
The Human Development Report includes data for all 193 member states of the United Nations, as well as Hong Kong and Palestine. However, the Human Development Index is not calculated for two UN member states: Monaco and North Korea, only some components of the index are calculated for these two countries. The Cook Islands, the Holy See (Vatican City), and Niue are the only three state parties within the United Nations System which are not included in the report. In total, the HDI is available for 192 countries and one territory.

Data is for the year 2023.

Human Development Index by country
| Rank | Change since 2015 | Country or territory | HDI value | % annual growth (2010–2023) |
|---|---|---|---|---|
| 1 | ▲ (2) | Iceland | 0.972 | ▲0.28% |
| 2 | ▼ (1) | Norway | 0.970 | ▲0.25% |
| 2 | Steady | Switzerland | 0.970 | ▲0.24% |
| 4 | ▲ (2) | Denmark | 0.962 | ▲0.35% |
| 5 | ▼ (1) | Germany | 0.959 | ▲0.19% |
| 5 | Steady | Sweden | 0.959 | ▲0.38% |
| 7 | ▲ (1) | Australia | 0.958 | ▲0.20% |
| 8 | ▼ (1) | Hong Kong | 0.955 | ▲0.38% |
| 8 | ▲ (2) | Netherlands | 0.955 | ▲0.26% |
| 10 | ▲ (3) | Belgium | 0.951 | ▲0.26% |
| 11 | ▲ (4) | Ireland | 0.949 | ▲0.38% |
| 12 | ▼ (4) | Finland | 0.948 | ▲0.27% |
| 13 | ▼ (2) | Singapore | 0.946 | ▲0.25% |
| 13 | ▲ (2) | United Kingdom | 0.946 | ▲0.24% |
| 15 | ▲ (27) | United Arab Emirates | 0.940 | ▲1.04% |
| 16 | ▼ (2) | Canada | 0.939 | ▲0.22% |
| 17 | ▲ (1) | Liechtenstein | 0.938 | ▲0.23% |
| 17 | ▼ (5) | New Zealand | 0.938 | ▲0.13% |
| 17 | Steady | United States | 0.938 | ▲0.10% |
| 20 | ▲ (1) | South Korea | 0.937 | ▲0.36% |
| 21 | ▲ (2) | Slovenia | 0.931 | ▲0.33% |
| 22 | ▼ (3) | Austria | 0.930 | ▲0.21% |
| 23 | ▼ (3) | Japan | 0.925 | ▲0.16% |
| 24 | ▲ (5) | Malta | 0.924 | ▲0.50% |
| 25 | ▼ (3) | Luxembourg | 0.922 | ▲0.14% |
| 26 | ▼ (1) | France | 0.920 | ▲0.28% |
| 27 | ▼ (3) | Israel | 0.919 | ▲0.26% |
| 28 | Steady | Spain | 0.918 | ▲0.40% |
| 29 | ▼ (3) | Czechia | 0.915 | ▲0.22% |
| 29 | ▲ (1) | Italy | 0.915 | ▲0.30% |
| 29 | ▼ (2) | San Marino | 0.915 | ▼0.32% |
| 32 | ▲ (1) | Andorra | 0.913 | ▲0.20% |
| 32 | ▲ (3) | Cyprus | 0.913 | ▲0.45% |
| 34 | ▼ (3) | Greece | 0.908 | ▲0.18% |
| 35 | ▼ (1) | Poland | 0.906 | ▲0.35% |
| 36 | ▼ (5) | Estonia | 0.905 | ▲0.33% |
| 37 | ▲ (9) | Saudi Arabia | 0.900 | ▲0.70% |
| 38 | ▼ (1) | Bahrain | 0.899 | ▲0.80% |
| 39 | ▼ (4) | Lithuania | 0.895 | ▲0.32% |
| 40 | ▲ (2) | Portugal | 0.890 | ▲0.42% |
| 41 | ▼ (1) | Croatia | 0.889 | ▲0.53% |
| 41 | ▲ (4) | Latvia | 0.889 | ▲0.51% |
| 43 | ▼ (4) | Qatar | 0.886 | ▲0.45% |
| 44 | ▼ (6) | Slovakia | 0.880 | ▲0.14% |
| 45 | ▼ (1) | Chile | 0.878 | ▲0.47% |
| 46 | ▲ (1) | Hungary | 0.870 | ▲0.22% |
| 47 | ▼ (7) | Argentina | 0.865 | ▲0.15% |
| 48 | Steady | Montenegro | 0.862 | ▲0.38% |
| 48 | ▲ (13) | Uruguay | 0.862 | ▲0.47% |
| 50 | ▲ (1) | Oman | 0.858 | ▲0.22% |
| 51 | ▲ (7) | Turkey | 0.853 | ▲1.10% |
| 52 | ▲ (1) | Kuwait | 0.852 | ▲0.36% |
| 53 | ▼ (5) | Antigua and Barbuda | 0.851 | ▲0.18% |
| 54 | ▲ (5) | Seychelles | 0.848 | ▲0.30% |
| 55 | ▲ (1) | Bulgaria | 0.845 | ▲0.09% |
| 55 | ▲ (2) | Romania | 0.845 | ▲0.14% |
| 57 | ▲ (6) | Georgia | 0.844 | ▲0.54% |
| 58 | ▼ (4) | Saint Kitts and Nevis | 0.840 | ▲0.49% |
| 59 | ▲ (6) | Panama | 0.839 | ▲0.47% |
| 60 | ▼ (12) | Brunei | 0.837 | ▲0.13% |
| 60 | ▼ (1) | Kazakhstan | 0.837 | ▲0.38% |
| 62 | ▲ (3) | Costa Rica | 0.833 | ▲0.39% |
| 62 | ▲ (5) | Serbia | 0.833 | ▲0.39% |
| 64 | ▼ (12) | Russia | 0.832 | ▲0.25% |
| 65 | ▼ (10) | Belarus | 0.824 | ▲0.12% |
| 66 | ▼ (3) | Bahamas | 0.820 | ▲0.21% |
| 67 | ▲ (2) | Malaysia | 0.819 | ▲0.41% |
| 68 | ▲ (4) | North Macedonia | 0.815 | ▲0.21% |
| 69 | Steady | Armenia | 0.811 | ▲0.52% |
| 69 | ▲ (9) | Barbados | 0.811 | ▲0.18% |
| 71 | Steady | Albania | 0.810 | ▲0.25% |
| 72 | ▼ (10) | Trinidad and Tobago | 0.807 | ▲0.30% |
| 73 | Steady | Mauritius | 0.806 | ▲0.44% |
| 74 | ▲ (7) | Bosnia and Herzegovina | 0.804 | ▲0.68% |
| 75 | ▼ (1) | Iran | 0.799 | ▲0.26% |
| 76 | ▲ (11) | Saint Vincent and the Grenadines | 0.798 | ▲0.17% |
| 76 | ▼ (2) | Thailand | 0.798 | ▲0.65% |
| 78 | ▲ (16) | China | 0.797 | ▲1.02% |
| 79 | ▲ (5) | Peru | 0.794 | ▲0.42% |
| 80 | ▼ (4) | Grenada | 0.791 | ▲0.15% |
| 81 | ▼ (1) | Azerbaijan | 0.789 | ▲0.30% |
| 81 | ▼ (2) | Mexico | 0.789 | ▲0.37% |
| 83 | ▲ (3) | Colombia | 0.788 | ▲0.29% |
| 84 | ▲ (4) | Brazil | 0.786 | ▲0.43% |
| 84 | ▼ (17) | Palau | 0.786 | ▲0.23% |
| 86 | ▲ (5) | Moldova | 0.785 | ▲0.53% |
| 87 | ▼ (10) | Ukraine | 0.779 | ▼0.35% |
| 88 | Steady | Ecuador | 0.777 | ▲0.32% |
| 89 | ▲ (6) | Dominican Republic | 0.776 | ▲0.67% |
| 89 | ▲ (33) | Guyana | 0.776 | ▲1.11% |
| 89 | ▼ (8) | Sri Lanka | 0.776 | ▲0.50% |
| 92 | ▲ (4) | Tonga | 0.769 | ▲0.35% |
| 93 | ▲ (10) | Maldives | 0.766 | ▲0.81% |
| 93 | ▲ (16) | Vietnam | 0.766 | ▲0.60% |
| 95 | ▲ (8) | Turkmenistan | 0.764 | ▲0.52% |
| 96 | ▲ (3) | Algeria | 0.763 | ▲0.27% |
| 97 | ▼ (16) | Cuba | 0.762 | ▼0.16% |
| 98 | Steady | Dominica | 0.761 | ▲0.06% |
| 99 | Steady | Paraguay | 0.756 | ▲0.36% |
| 100 | ▲ (15) | Egypt | 0.754 | ▲0.73% |
| 100 | ▼ (4) | Jordan | 0.754 | ▲0.10% |
| 102 | ▼ (12) | Lebanon | 0.752 | ▼0.29% |
| 103 | ▼ (11) | Saint Lucia | 0.748 | ▼0.07% |
| 104 | ▼ (11) | Mongolia | 0.747 | ▲0.48% |
| 105 | ▼ (4) | Tunisia | 0.746 | ▲0.22% |
| 106 | ▼ (1) | South Africa | 0.741 | ▲0.50% |
| 107 | ▲ (7) | Uzbekistan | 0.740 | ▲0.62% |
| 108 | ▲ (8) | Bolivia | 0.733 | ▲0.45% |
| 108 | ▼ (1) | Gabon | 0.733 | ▲0.46% |
| 108 | ▲ (11) | Marshall Islands | 0.733 | N/A (Note: HDI not available before 2011 in latest report) |
| 111 | ▲ (9) | Botswana | 0.731 | ▲0.69% |
| 111 | ▼ (1) | Fiji | 0.731 | ▲0.35% |
| 113 | ▲ (4) | Indonesia | 0.728 | ▲0.56% |
| 114 | ▼ (6) | Suriname | 0.722 | ▼0.07% |
| 115 | ▼ (9) | Belize | 0.721 | ▼0.23% |
| 115 | ▼ (14) | Libya | 0.721 | ▼0.31% |
| 117 | ▼ (6) | Jamaica | 0.720 | ▼0.06% |
| 117 | ▲ (1) | Kyrgyzstan | 0.720 | ▲0.49% |
| 117 | ▲ (3) | Philippines | 0.720 | ▲0.45% |
| 120 | ▲ (7) | Morocco | 0.710 | ▲1.21% |
| 121 | ▼ (37) | Venezuela | 0.709 | ▼0.68% |
| 122 | ▼ (9) | Samoa | 0.708 | ▼0.02% |
| 123 | Steady | Nicaragua | 0.706 | ▲0.76% |
| 124 | ▲ (2) | Nauru | 0.703 | ▲1.84% |
| 125 | ▲ (9) | Bhutan | 0.698 | ▲1.32% |
| 126 | ▲ (16) | Eswatini | 0.695 | ▲1.70% |
| 126 | ▼ (2) | Iraq | 0.695 | ▲0.57% |
| 128 | Steady | Tajikistan | 0.691 | ▲0.61% |
| 129 | ▼ (1) | Tuvalu | 0.689 | ▲0.39% |
| 130 | ▲ (9) | Bangladesh | 0.685 | ▲1.54% |
| 130 | ▲ (5) | India | 0.685 | ▲0.99% |
| 132 | ▼ (7) | El Salvador | 0.678 | ▲0.21% |
| 133 | ▼ (2) | Equatorial Guinea | 0.674 | ▲0.54% |
| 133 | ▼ (21) | Palestine | 0.674 | ▲0.33% |
| 135 | ▼ (7) | Cape Verde | 0.668 | ▲0.15% |
| 136 | Steady | Namibia | 0.665 | ▲0.36% |
| 137 | ▼ (4) | Guatemala | 0.662 | ▲0.21% |
| 138 | ▼ (6) | Republic of the Congo | 0.649 | ▲0.17% |
| 139 | ▲ (1) | Honduras | 0.645 | ▲0.38% |
| 140 | ▼ (2) | Kiribati | 0.644 | ▲0.61% |
| 141 | Steady | São Tomé and Príncipe | 0.637 | ▲0.86% |
| 142 | ▼ (5) | Timor-Leste | 0.634 | ▼1.01% |
| 143 | ▲ (4) | Ghana | 0.628 | ▲0.44% |
| 143 | ▲ (5) | Kenya | 0.628 | ▲0.82% |
| 145 | ▲ (5) | Nepal | 0.622 | ▲0.85% |
| 146 | Steady | Vanuatu | 0.621 | ▲0.50% |
| 147 | ▼ (4) | Laos | 0.617 | ▲0.90% |
| 148 | ▼ (3) | Angola | 0.616 | ▲1.14% |
| 149 | ▼ (6) | Micronesia | 0.615 | ▼0.13% |
| 150 | ▲ (3) | Myanmar | 0.609 | ▲1.54% |
| 151 | ▲ (5) | Cambodia | 0.606 | ▲0.85% |
| 152 | ▲ (2) | Comoros | 0.603 | ▲0.94% |
| 153 | ▼ (1) | Zimbabwe | 0.598 | ▲1.12% |
| 154 | Steady | Zambia | 0.595 | ▲0.63% |
| 155 | ▼ (5) | Cameroon | 0.588 | ▲1.10% |
| 156 | ▼ (7) | Solomon Islands | 0.584 | ▲0.13% |
| 157 | ▲ (10) | Ivory Coast | 0.582 | ▲1.07% |
| 157 | ▲ (3) | Uganda | 0.582 | ▲0.80% |
| 159 | ▲ (5) | Rwanda | 0.578 | ▲1.02% |
| 160 | ▲ (1) | Papua New Guinea | 0.576 | ▲1.12% |
| 161 | ▲ (4) | Togo | 0.571 | ▲1.29% |
| 162 | ▼ (3) | Syria | 0.564 | ▼1.42% |
| 163 | ▼ (5) | Mauritania | 0.563 | ▲0.51% |
| 164 | ▼ (2) | Nigeria | 0.560 | ▲0.97% |
| 165 | ▲ (1) | Tanzania | 0.555 | ▲0.64% |
| 166 | ▼ (9) | Haiti | 0.554 | ▲1.74% |
| 167 | ▲ (1) | Lesotho | 0.550 | ▲0.86% |
| 168 | ▼ (5) | Pakistan | 0.544 | ▲0.71% |
| 169 | ▲ (1) | Senegal | 0.530 | ▲0.80% |
| 170 | ▲ (5) | Gambia | 0.524 | ▲0.82% |
| 171 | ▲ (8) | Democratic Republic of the Congo | 0.522 | ▲1.06% |
| 172 | ▼ (1) | Malawi | 0.517 | ▲0.81% |
| 173 | ▼ (4) | Benin | 0.515 | ▲0.39% |
| 174 | ▲ (2) | Guinea-Bissau | 0.514 | ▲0.76% |
| 175 | ▲ (6) | Djibouti | 0.513 | ▲1.67% |
| 176 | ▼ (3) | Sudan | 0.511 | ▲0.45% |
| 177 | Steady | Liberia | 0.510 | ▲0.48% |
| 178 | ▼ (1) | Eritrea | 0.503 | ▲0.62% |
| 179 | ▲ (3) | Guinea | 0.500 | ▲1.06% |
| 180 | ▲ (4) | Ethiopia | 0.497 | ▲1.55% |
| 181 | ▼ (7) | Afghanistan | 0.496 | ▲0.24% |
| 182 | ▲ (1) | Mozambique | 0.493 | ▲1.04% |
| 183 | ▼ (11) | Madagascar | 0.487 | ▼0.02% |
| 184 | ▼ (4) | Yemen | 0.470 | ▼1.30% |
| 185 | Steady | Sierra Leone | 0.467 | ▲0.80% |
| 186 | ▲ (1) | Burkina Faso | 0.459 | ▲1.37% |
| 187 | ▼ (2) | Burundi | 0.439 | ▲0.32% |
| 188 | Steady | Mali | 0.419 | ▲0.08% |
| 188 | ▲ (3) | Niger | 0.419 | ▲1.34% |
| 190 | ▼ (1) | Chad | 0.416 | ▲0.66% |
| 191 | ▼ (1) | Central African Republic | 0.414 | ▲0.58% |
| 192 | N/A (Note: HDI not available before 2022) | Somalia | 0.404 | N/A |
| 193 | Steady | South Sudan | 0.388 | ▼0.61% |

== Regions and groups ==
The Human Development Report also reports the HDI for various groups of countries. These include regional groupings based on the UNDP regional classifications, HDI groups including the countries currently falling into a given HDI bracket, OECD members and various other UN groupings. The aggregate HDI values are calculated in the same way as for individual countries with the input data being the weighted average for all countries with available data in the group.

Table of regions and groups by HDI
| Region or group | 1990 | 2000 | 2010 | 2015 | 2020 | 2021 | 2022 | 2023 | Annual growth (1990-2023) |
|---|---|---|---|---|---|---|---|---|---|
| OECD | 0.801 | 0.846 | 0.883 | 0.899 | 0.903 | 0.904 | 0.910 | 0.916 | +0.41% |
| Very high human development | 0.797 | 0.838 | 0.879 | 0.898 | 0.901 | 0.903 | 0.908 | 0.914 | +0.42% |
| Europe and Central Asia | 0.674 | 0.686 | 0.753 | 0.789 | 0.802 | 0.803 | 0.815 | 0.818 | +0.59% |
| Latin America and the Caribbean | 0.648 | 0.697 | 0.747 | 0.767 | 0.764 | 0.762 | 0.778 | 0.783 | +0.58% |
| High human development | 0.569 | 0.636 | 0.714 | 0.744 | 0.763 | 0.766 | 0.774 | 0.777 | +0.95% |
| East Asia and the Pacific | 0.514 | 0.604 | 0.699 | 0.735 | 0.764 | 0.768 | 0.773 | 0.775 | +1.25% |
| World | 0.608 | 0.651 | 0.707 | 0.731 | 0.742 | 0.742 | 0.752 | 0.756 | +0.66% |
| Small Island Developing States | 0.617 | 0.660 | 0.702 | 0.727 | 0.731 | 0.727 | 0.737 | 0.739 | +0.55% |
| Arab states | 0.550 | 0.615 | 0.670 | 0.693 | 0.707 | 0.710 | 0.716 | 0.719 | +0.82% |
| Developing countries | 0.520 | 0.576 | 0.649 | 0.680 | 0.696 | 0.696 | 0.708 | 0.712 | +0.96% |
| South Asia | 0.454 | 0.508 | 0.590 | 0.627 | 0.645 | 0.641 | 0.665 | 0.672 | +1.20% |
| Medium human development | 0.439 | 0.491 | 0.573 | 0.611 | 0.631 | 0.629 | 0.649 | 0.656 | +1.22% |
| Sub-Saharan Africa | 0.405 | 0.435 | 0.510 | 0.540 | 0.557 | 0.558 | 0.565 | 0.568 | +1.03% |
| Least developed countries | 0.360 | 0.411 | 0.494 | 0.526 | 0.550 | 0.549 | 0.555 | 0.560 | +1.35% |
| Low human development | 0.346 | 0.393 | 0.467 | 0.491 | 0.507 | 0.507 | 0.512 | 0.515 | +1.21% |

== See also ==
- List of countries by Human Development Index by region
  - Africa
  - Asia and Oceania
  - Europe
  - Latin America
- List of countries by inequality-adjusted Human Development Index
- List of countries by planetary pressures–adjusted Human Development Index
- List of subnational entities with the highest and lowest Human Development Index
