= List of European Union member states by GDP growth =

This is a list of estimates of the real gross domestic product growth rate (not rebased GDP) in the 27 European Union member states for the latest years recorded, according to EuroStat.

== List ==
Real GDP Growth Rates in the European Union

Rank	Country	GDP growth rate (%)	Year
1	Ireland	8.0	2025
2	Cyprus	4.8	2025 est.
3	Malta	4.7	2025
4	Poland	3.8	2025
5	Croatia	3.5	2025 est.
5	Denmark	3.5	2025
7	Bulgaria	3.0	2025
7	Lithuania	3.0	2025
9	Czech Republic	2.6	2025
9	Spain	2.6	2025 est.
11	Latvia	2.2	2025
12	Greece	2.1	2025 est.
13	Portugal	1.9	2025 est.
14	Netherlands	1.6	2025
15	Slovenia	1.5	2025
16	Sweden	1.4	2025
16	Luxembourg	1.4	2025 est.
18	Estonia	1.3	2025
19	Belgium	0.9	2025 est.
19	Slovakia	0.9	2025
21	Finland	0.8	2025
21	France	0.8	2025 est.
21	Romania	0.8	2025 est.
24	Hungary	0.7	2025 est.
24	Austria	0.7	2025
26	Italy	0.6	2025
27	Germany	0.2	2025 est.

== See also ==
- GDP
