= List of African countries by GDP (nominal) =

GDP of African Countries 2025

Gross domestic product (GDP) is the market value of all final goods and services from a nation in a given year. Countries in Africa are sorted according to data from the International Monetary Fund. The figures presented here do not take into account differences in the cost of living in different countries, and the results can vary greatly from one year to another based on fluctuations in the exchange rates of the country's currency. Such fluctuations may change a country's ranking from one year to the next, even though they often make little or no difference to the standard of living of its population.

Comparisons of national wealth are also frequently made on the basis of purchasing power parity (PPP), to adjust for differences in the cost of living in different countries. PPP largely removes the exchange rate problem, but has its own drawbacks; it does not reflect the value of economic output in international trade, and it also requires more estimation than nominal GDP. On the whole, PPP per capita figures are more narrowly spread than nominal GDP per capita figures.

GDP (nominal) of Africa (2026)
1. South Africa (13.1%)
2. Egypt (11.8%)
3. Nigeria (10.3%)
4. Algeria (9.90%)
5. Ethiopia (5.40%)
6. Morocco (5.20%)
7. Angola (4.20%)
8. Kenya (4.10%)
9. Ghana (3.40%)
10. Democratic Republic of the Congo (3.30%)
11. Others (30.0%)

Rank	Country	Nominal GDP (2026, million US$)	Population (2026)	Per capita (2026, US$)
1	South Africa	489,083	63,858,000	7,659
2	Egypt	442,886	110,058,000	4,024
3	Nigeria	386,671	242,578,000	1,594
4	Algeria	331,894	48,028,000	6,910
5	Ethiopia	201,420	112,370,000	1,131
6	Morocco	195,632	38,050,000	5,141
7	Angola	157,297	40,584,000	3,876
8	Kenya	151,151	54,269,000	2,785
9	Ghana	128,638	35,698,000	3,604
10	Democratic Republic of the Congo	122,281	110,020,000	1,111
11	Ivory Coast	110,446	33,838,000	3,264
12	Tanzania	96,181	72,564,000	1,325
13	Uganda	72,242	49,706,000	1,453
14	Zimbabwe	65,915	17,728,000	3,718
15	Cameroon	64,810	30,646,000	2,115
16	Tunisia	62,738	12,415,000	5,053
17	Libya	56,948	7,535,000	7,557
18	Guinea	45,307	16,198,000	2,797
19	Zambia	42,384	22,522,000	1,882
20	Senegal	37,076 (2025)	19,173,000 (2025)	1,934 (2025)
21	Mali	34,909	26,000,000	1,343
22	Burkina Faso	32,408	24,627,000	1,316
23	Sudan	30,861	51,729,000	597
24	Benin	27,410	15,232,000	1,799
25	Gabon	25,993	2,356,000	11,034
26	Chad	25,237	19,491,000	1,295
27	Mozambique	24,769	36,826,000	673
28	Niger	23,367	30,204,000	774
29	Botswana	22,125	2,584,000	8,563
30	Madagascar	20,975	32,319,000	649
31	Republic of the Congo	19,115	6,668,000	2,867
32	Rwanda	18,673	14,471,000	1,290
33	Malawi	18,309	24,750,000	740
34	Namibia	17,938	3,124,000	5,742
35	Mauritius	16,944	1,239,000	13,671
36	Somalia	14,820	17,438,000	850
37	Equatorial Guinea	14,280	1,683,000	8,484
38	Mauritania	14,264	4,732,000	3,015
39	Togo	13,141	8,878,000	1,480
40	Sierra Leone	8,520	9,002,000	946
41	South Sudan	7,983	12,436,000	642
42	Burundi	7,606	14,903,000	510
43	Eswatini	6,054	1,268,000	4,775
44	Liberia	5,715	5,854,000	976
45	Central African Republic	5,079	5,699,000	891
46	Djibouti	4,870	1,069,000	4,556
47	Cape Verde	3,389	517,000	6,556
48	Lesotho	3,102	2,390,000	1,298
49	The Gambia	3,018	2,930,000	1,030
50	Guinea-Bissau	2,944	2,060,000	1,429
51	Seychelles	2,366	124,000	19,157
52	Eritrea	1,982 (2019)	3,497,000 (2019)	567 (2019)
53	Comoros	1,728	930,000	1,859
54	São Tomé and Príncipe	1,123	245,000	4,582
--	Total	3,667,743	1,525,113,000	2,405

== See also ==
- List of African countries by GDP (PPP)
- List of African countries by Human Development Index
- Economy of Africa
