= List of sovereign states in Europe by budget revenues per capita =

This is a map and list of European countries by budget revenues per capita. The data is from the CIA Factbook, with numbers from 2007 in US$.

== Map ==

Countries in blue have more than US$10,000 per capita, countries in green are between $3,000 and $10,000 and countries in yellow are below $3,000 budget revenue per capita.

== List ==
Country	budget per capita (USD)	budget (in million USD)
Albania	772	2,782
Andorra	5,037	333
Armenia	560	1,666
Austria	21,646	177,500
Azerbaijan	831	6,755
Belarus	2,133	20,750
Belgium	21,179	220,100
Bosnia and Herzegovina	1,558	7,094
Bulgaria	2,299	16,840
Croatia	5,020	22,560
Cyprus	-	-
Czech Republic	7,048	72,100
Denmark	31,199	170,600
Estonia	5,968	7,854
Finland	23,709	124,200
France	18,873	1,287,000
(Georgia (country)) Georgia	792	3,680
Germany	17,648	1,454,000
Greece	10,760	115,200
Hungary	6,428	64,000
Iceland	31,927	9,640
(Republic of Ireland) Ireland	22,686	93,220
Italy	17,046	991,200
Kazakhstan	1,542	23,580
Kosovo	-	-
Latvia	4,633	10,470
Liechtenstein	25,812	995
Lithuania	3,714	13,280
Luxembourg	41,189	19,780
Malta	8,671	3,485
Moldova	423	1,830
Monaco	26,553	863
Montenegro	945	-
Netherlands	21,695	359,500
North Macedonia	1,219	2,508
Norway	48,898	226,300
Poland	2,216	85,390
Portugal	9,021	96,010
Romania	2,340	52,130
Russia	2,114	299,000
San Marino	25,342	709
Serbia	1,308	9,600
Slovakia	6,303	34,340
Slovenia	9,540	19,170
Spain	14,549	588,500
Sweden	27,582	249,100
Switzerland	19,934	150,600
Ukraine	940	43,540
United Kingdom	18,987	1,154,000
Vatican City	332,618	310

== See also ==
- International organisations in Europe
- List of European countries by budget revenues
- List of European countries by GDP (nominal) per capita
- List of European countries by Real GDP per capita
- List of European countries by GDP (PPP) per capita
- List of European countries by GNI (nominal) per capita
- List of European countries by GNI (PPP) per capita
- List of countries by GDP (nominal) per capita
- List of countries by GDP (PPP) per capita
- List of countries by GDP (nominal)
- List of countries by GDP (PPP)
