= List of sovereign states in Europe by budget revenues =

This is map and list of European countries by budget revenues and budget revenues per capita for year 2013 from Eurostat and CIA World Factbook. Countries in blue have more than €100 billion, green €10-€99 billion and yellow below €10 billion budget revenues from Eurostat and CIA Factbook

Source	State (51)	Budget per capita	Budget
Eurostat	Austria	18,388.1	155,720.7
Eurostat	Belgium	17,858.2	198,315.7
Eurostat	Bulgaria	2,043.8	14,859.7
Eurostat	Croatia	4,177.9	17,767.3
Eurostat	Cyprus	7,675.7	6,655.8
Eurostat	Czech Republic	5,815.6	61,137.5
Eurostat	Denmark	24,966.1	140,109.5
Eurostat	Estonia	8,407.0	11,091.1
Eurostat	Finland	19,918.9	108,331.0
Eurostat	France	16,540.7	1,087,404.0
Eurostat	Germany	14,901.6	1,223,390.0
Eurostat	Greece	7,524.3	83,465.0
Eurostat	Hungary	4,718.7	46,685.8
Eurostat	Iceland	15,009.8	4,859.6
Eurostat	Ireland	12,791.9	58,866.1
Eurostat	Italy	12,201.3	744,873.0
Eurostat	Latvia	4,075.6	8,209.6
Eurostat	Lithuania	3,773.4	11,162.4
Eurostat	Luxembourg	36,371.4	19,829.7
Eurostat	Malta	6,982.8	2,950.5
Eurostat	Netherlands	16,980.7	285,269.0
Eurostat	Norway	42,148.8	214,115.8
Eurostat	Poland	3,797.7	146,263.0
Eurostat	Portugal	6,908.3	72,409.6
Eurostat	Romania	2,319.9	46,504.4
Eurostat	Slovakia	4,789.5	25,925.8
Eurostat	Slovenia	7,655.7	15,766.8
Eurostat	Spain	8,411.8	386,250.0
Eurostat	Sweden	22,616.4	217,128.9
Eurostat	Switzerland	20,293.2	160,921.1
Eurostat	United Kingdom	12,257.1	785,521.5
CIA	Albania	920.47	2,561.67
CIA	Andorra	11,433.33	857.50
CIA	Armenia	738.97	2,230.83
CIA	Azerbaijan	242.33	2,300.83
CIA	Belarus	235.02	2,223.33
CIA	Bosnia and Herzegovina	1,666.02	6,409.17
CIA	Georgia	815.10	4,028.33
CIA	Kazakhstan	200.00	3,660.00
CIA	Kosovo	874.41	1,596.67
CIA	Liechtenstein	22,416.67	829.42
CIA	Moldova	700.66	2,442.50
CIA	Monaco	24,166.67	870.00
CIA	Montenegro	225.81	140.00
CIA	North Macedonia	1,219.34	2,519.17
CIA	Russia	2,550.16	365,833.33
CIA	San Marino	17,388.02	556.42
CIA	Serbia	2,290.32	16,250.00
CIA	Turkey	2,069.53	158,666.67
CIA	Ukraine	1,052.19	47,833.67

== See also ==
- International organisations in Europe
- Lists of European countries:
  - by budget revenues per capita
  - by Real GDP per capita
  - by GDP (nominal) per capita
  - by GDP (PPP) per capita
  - by GNI (nominal) per capita
  - by GNI (PPP) per capita
- Lists of countries:
  - by GDP (nominal) per capita
  - by GDP (PPP) per capita
  - by GDP (nominal)
  - by GDP (PPP)
