= List of countries by Human Development Index by region =

This is a list of countries by the Human Development Index [HDI] as included in the United Nations Development Programme's Human Development Report organized by continent or other international regions. The Human Development Index (HDI) is a summary index assessing countries on 3 dimensions, health, education and standard of living using life expectancy at birth, expected years of schooling for children and mean years of schooling for adults, and GNI PPP per capita. The final HDI is a value between 0 and 1 with countries grouped into four categories depending on the value, very high for HDI of 0.800 and above, high from 0.700 to 0.799, medium from 0.550 to 0.699 and low below 0.550.

== List of countries by continent ==
=== Africa ===
10 highest HDIs

Rank	Country	HDI
Rank	Country	2023 data (2025 report) rankings
Very high human development
1	Seychelles	0.848
2	Mauritius	0.806
High human development
3	Algeria	0.763
4	Egypt	0.754
5	Tunisia	0.746
6	South Africa	0.741
7	Gabon	0.733
8	Botswana	0.731
9	Libya	0.721
10	Morocco	0.710

10 lowest HDIs

Rank	Country	HDI
Rank	Country	2023 data (2025 report) rankings
Low human development
1	South Sudan	0.388
2	Somalia	0.404
3	Central African Republic	0.414
4	Chad	0.416
5	Mali	0.419
6	Niger	0.419
7	Burundi	0.439
8	Burkina Faso	0.459
9	Sierra Leone	0.467
10	Madagascar	0.487

=== Asia ===
10 highest HDIs

Rank	Country	HDI
Rank	Country	2023 data (2025 report) rankings
Very high human development
1	Hong Kong, China (SAR)	0.955
2	Singapore	0.946
3	United Arab Emirates	0.940
4	South Korea	0.937
5	Japan	0.925
6	Israel	0.919
7	Saudi Arabia	0.900
8	Bahrain	0.899
9	Qatar	0.886
10	Oman	0.858

10 lowest HDIs

Rank	Country	HDI
Rank	Country	2023 data (2025 report) rankings
Low human development
1	Yemen	0.470
2	Afghanistan	0.496
3	Pakistan	0.544
Medium human development
4	Syria	0.564
5	Cambodia	0.606
6	Myanmar	0.609
7	Laos	0.617
8	Nepal	0.622
9	East Timor	0.634
10	Palestine	0.674

=== Europe ===
10 highest HDIs

Rank	Country	HDI
Rank	Country	2023 data (2025 report) rankings
Very high human development
1	Iceland	0.972
2	Switzerland	0.970
2	Norway	0.970
4	Denmark	0.962
5	Sweden	0.959
5	Germany	0.959
7	Netherlands	0.955
8	Belgium	0.951
9	Ireland	0.949
10	Finland	0.948

10 lowest HDIs

Rank	Country	HDI
Rank	Country	2023 data (2025 report) rankings
High human development
1	Ukraine	0.779
2	Moldova	0.785
3	Azerbaijan	0.789
Very high human development
4	Bosnia and Herzegovina	0.804
5	Albania	0.810
6	Armenia	0.811
7	North Macedonia	0.815
8	Belarus	0.824
9	Kazakhstan	0.837
10	Georgia	0.844

=== North America ===
10 highest HDIs

Rank	Country	HDI
Rank	Country	2023 data (2025 report) rankings
Very high human development
1	Canada	0.939
2	United States	0.938
3	Antigua and Barbuda	0.851
4	Saint Kitts and Nevis	0.840
5	Panama	0.839
6	Costa Rica	0.833
7	Bahamas	0.820
8	Barbados	0.811
9	Trinidad and Tobago	0.807
High human development
10	Saint Vincent and the Grenadines	0.798
11	Mexico	0.789

10 lowest HDIs

Rank	Country	HDI
Rank	Country	2023 data (2025 report) rankings
Medium human development
1	Haiti	0.554
2	Honduras	0.645
3	Guatemala	0.662
4	El Salvador	0.678
High human development
5	Nicaragua	0.706
6	Jamaica	0.720
7	Belize	0.721
8	Saint Lucia	0.748
9	Dominica	0.761
10	Cuba	0.762

=== Oceania ===
Rank	Country	HDI
Rank	Country	2023 data (2025 report) rankings
Very high human development
1	Australia	0.958
2	New Zealand	0.938
High human development
3	Palau	0.786
4	Tonga	0.769
5	Marshall Islands	0.733
6	Fiji	0.731
7	Samoa	0.708
8	Nauru	0.703
Medium human development
9	Tuvalu	0.689
10	Kiribati	0.644
11	Vanuatu	0.621
12	Micronesia	0.615
13	Solomon Islands	0.584
14	Papua New Guinea	0.576

=== South America ===
Rank	Country	HDI
Rank	Country	2023 data (2025 report) rankings
Very high human development
1	Chile	0.878
2	Argentina	0.865
3	Uruguay	0.862
High human development
4	Peru	0.794
5	Colombia	0.788
6	Brazil	0.786
7	Ecuador	0.777
8	Guyana	0.776
9	Paraguay	0.756
10	Bolivia	0.733
11	Suriname	0.722
12	Venezuela	0.709

== List of countries by intercontinental region ==
=== Arab States ===
10 highest HDIs

Rank	Country	HDI
Rank	Country	2023 data (2025 report) rankings
Very high human development
1	United Arab Emirates	0.940
2	Saudi Arabia	0.900
3	Bahrain	0.899
4	Qatar	0.886
5	Oman	0.858
6	Kuwait	0.852
High human development
7	Algeria	0.763
8	Egypt	0.754
8	Jordan	0.754
10	Lebanon	0.752

10 lowest HDIs

Rank	Country	HDI
Rank	Country	2023 data (2025 report) rankings
Low human development
1	Somalia	0.404
2	Yemen	0.470
3	Sudan	0.511
4	Djibouti	0.513
Medium human development
5	Mauritania	0.563
6	Syria	0.564
7	Comoros	0.603
8	Palestine	0.674
9	Iraq	0.695
High human development
10	Morocco	0.710

=== Commonwealth of Nations ===
10 highest HDIs

Rank	Country	HDI
Rank	Country	2023 data (2025 report) rankings
Very high human development
1	Australia	0.958
2	United Kingdom	0.946
3	Singapore	0.946
4	Canada	0.939
5	New Zealand	0.938
6	Malta	0.924
7	Cyprus	0.913
8	Antigua and Barbuda	0.851
9	Saint Kitts and Nevis	0.840
10	Brunei Darussalam	0.837

10 lowest HDIs

Rank	Country	HDI
Rank	Country	2023 data (2025 report) rankings
Low human development
1	Sierra Leone	0.467
2	Mozambique	0.493
3	Malawi	0.517
4	Gambia	0.524
5	Pakistan	0.544
Medium human development
6	Lesotho	0.550
7	Tanzania	0.555
8	Nigeria	0.560
9	Togo	0.571
9	Rwanda	0.578
10	Zimbabwe	0.598

=== East Asia and the Pacific ===
10 highest HDIs

Rank	Country	HDI
Rank	Country	2023 data (2025 report) rankings
Very high human development
1	Australia	0.958
2	Hong Kong, China (SAR)	0.955
3	Singapore	0.946
4	New Zealand	0.938
5	South Korea	0.937
6	Japan	0.925
7	Brunei	0.837
8	Malaysia	0.819
High human development
9	Thailand	0.798
10	China	0.797

10 lowest HDIs

Rank	Country	HDI
Rank	Country	2023 data (2025 report) rankings
Medium human development
1	Papua New Guinea	0.576
2	Solomon Islands	0.584
3	Cambodia	0.606
4	Myanmar	0.609
4	Micronesia	0.615
6	Laos	0.617
7	Vanuatu	0.621
8	East Timor	0.634
9	Kiribati	0.644
10	Tuvalu	0.689

=== European Union ===
10 highest HDIs

Rank	Country	HDI
Rank	Country	2023 data (2025 report) rankings
Very high human development
1	Denmark	0.962
2	Germany	0.959
3	Sweden	0.959
4	Netherlands	0.955
5	Belgium	0.951
6	Ireland	0.949
7	Finland	0.948
8	Slovenia	0.931
9	Austria	0.930
10	Malta	0.924

10 lowest HDIs

Rank	Country	HDI
Rank	Country	2023 data (2025 report) rankings
Very high human development
1	Romania	0.845
2	Bulgaria	0.845
3	Hungary	0.870
4	Slovakia	0.880
5	Latvia	0.889
6	Croatia	0.889
7	Portugal	0.890
7	Lithuania	0.895
9	Estonia	0.905
10	Poland	0.906

=== Latin America and the Caribbean ===
10 highest HDIs

Rank	Country	HDI
Rank	Country	2023 data (2025 report) rankings
Very high human development
1	Chile	0.878
2	Argentina	0.865
3	Uruguay	0.862
4	Antigua and Barbuda	0.851
5	Saint Kitts and Nevis	0.840
6	Panama	0.839
7	Costa Rica	0.833
8	Bahamas	0.820
9	Barbados	0.811
10	Trinidad and Tobago	0.807

10 lowest HDIs

Rank	Country	HDI
Rank	Country	2023 data (2025 report) rankings
Medium human development
1	Haiti	0.554
2	Honduras	0.645
3	Guatemala	0.662
4	El Salvador	0.678
High human development
5	Nicaragua	0.706
6	Venezuela	0.709
7	Jamaica	0.720
8	Belize	0.721
9	Suriname	0.722
10	Bolivia	0.733

=== OECD ===
10 highest HDIs

Rank	Country	HDI
Rank	Country	2023 data (2025 report) rankings
Very high human development
1	Iceland	0.972
1	Norway	0.970
2	Switzerland	0.970
3	Denmark	0.962
4	Germany	0.959
5	Sweden	0.959
6	Australia	0.958
7	Netherlands	0.955
8	Belgium	0.951
9	Ireland	0.949
10	Finland	0.948

10 lowest HDIs

Rank	Country	HDI
Rank	Country	2023 data (2025 report) rankings
High human development
1	Colombia	0.788
2	Mexico	0.789
Very high human development
3	Costa Rica	0.833
4	Turkey	0.853
5	Hungary	0.870
5	Chile	0.878
7	Slovakia	0.880
8	Latvia	0.889
9	Portugal	0.890
9	Lithuania	0.895
10	Estonia	0.905

=== Organisation of Islamic Cooperation ===
10 highest HDIs

Rank	Country	HDI
Rank	Country	2023 data (2025 report) rankings
Very high human development
1	United Arab Emirates	0.940
2	Saudi Arabia	0.900
3	Bahrain	0.899
4	Qatar	0.886
5	Oman	0.858
6	Turkey	0.853
7	Kuwait	0.852
8	Brunei	0.837
	Kazakhstan	0.837
9	Malaysia	0.819
10	Albania	0.810

10 lowest HDIs

Rank	Country	HDI
Rank	Country	2023 data (2025 report) rankings
Low human development
1	Somalia	0.404
2	Chad	0.416
2	Niger	0.419
4	Mali	0.419
5	Burkina Faso	0.459
6	Sierra Leone	0.467
7	Yemen	0.470
8	Mozambique	0.493
9	Afghanistan	0.496
10	Guinea	0.500

=== Small Island Developing States ===
10 highest HDIs

Rank	Country	HDI
Rank	Country	2023 data (2025 report) rankings
Very high human development
1	Singapore	0.946
2	Bahrain	0.899
3	Antigua and Barbuda	0.851
4	Seychelles	0.848
5	Saint Kitts and Nevis	0.840
6	Bahamas	0.820
7	Barbados	0.811
8	Trinidad and Tobago	0.807
9	Mauritius	0.806
High human development
10	Saint Vincent and the Grenadines	0.798

10 lowest HDIs

Rank	Country	HDI
Rank	Country	2023 data (2025 report) rankings
Low human development
1	Guinea-Bissau	0.514
Medium human development
2	Haiti	0.554
3	Papua New Guinea	0.576
4	Solomon Islands	0.584
5	Comoros	0.603
6	Micronesia	0.615
7	Vanuatu	0.621
8	East Timor	0.634
9	São Tomé and Príncipe	0.637
10	Cape Verde	0.668

== See also ==
- List of countries by Human Development Index
- List of countries by inequality-adjusted Human Development Index
- List of countries by planetary pressures–adjusted Human Development Index
