= List of European countries by Real GDP per capita =

This is a list of European countries by Real GDP per capita. Real Gross Domestic Product (GDP) per capita is an inflation-adjusted measure that reflects the value of all goods and services produced by a country in a given year, divided by the country's population.

== Table of European countries by Real GDP per capita ==
Below is a table of European countries by Real GDP per capita in Euros (€). Countries are ranked by their 2023 figures unless otherwise stated.

Real GDP per capita by country (in €)
Country	Value	Year
Luxembourg	83,320	2023
Norway	71,870	2023
Ireland	71,700	2023
Switzerland	63,870	2023
Denmark	52,510	2023
Sweden	44,620	2023
Netherlands	44,460	2023
Iceland	41,490	2023
Austria	37,860	2023
Belgium	37,340	2023
Finland	36,760	2023
Germany	36,290	2023
France	33,750	2023
United Kingdom	32,910	2019
Cyprus	29,080	2023
Italy	28,880	2023
Malta	26,110	2023
Spain	25,620	2023
Slovenia	22,130	2023
Greece	19,460	2023
Portugal	19,250	2023
Czechia	18,480	2023
Slovakia	16,710	2023
Lithuania	15,330	2023
Estonia	15,250	2023
Croatia	15,020	2023
Poland	14,880	2023
Hungary	14,430	2023
Turkey	14,010	2023
Latvia	13,300	2023
Romania	10,250	2023
Bulgaria	7,900	2023
Montenegro	6,900	2023
Serbia	6,500	2023
North Macedonia	4,980	2022
Albania	4,940	2022

== See also ==
- List of European countries by GDP (nominal) per capita
- List of sovereign states in Europe by net average wage
- List of countries by GDP (nominal) per capita
- List of countries by GDP (PPP) per capita
- List of countries by GDP (nominal)
- List of countries by GDP (PPP)
