= List of sovereign states in Europe by GNI (nominal) per capita =

This is a map of European countries by GNI (gross national income nominal) per capita for the year 2021. High income, defined by the World Bank as $13,205 or more, is indicated in purple; upper middle income, ranging from $4,256 and $13,205, is shown in orange; and lower middle income between $1,086 and $4,255, is represented in red.

== Explanation ==
For the current 2021 fiscal year, low-income economies are defined as those with a GNI per capita, calculated using the World Bank Atlas method, of $1,085 or less. Lower middle-income economies have a GNI per capita between $1,086 and $4,255; upper middle-income economies fall between $4,256 and $13,205; and high-income economies have a GNI per capita of $13,205 or more.

State (Note: Only 52 sovereign states are listed, including Kosovo and Vatican which are not UN members.)	GNI (nom.) per capita	GDP (nom.) per capita	GDP (PPP) per capita	GNI (PPP) per capita
Albania	6,110	5,991	15,225	13,580
Andorra	n/d	n/d	n/d	n/d
Austria	52,210	53,859	57,890	58,940
Belarus	6,950	6,487	20,577	19,320
Belgium	50,510	50,103	53,972	55,370
Bosnia and Herzegovina	6,770	6,728	15,935	15,660
Bulgaria	10,720	11,321	25,471	23,780
Croatia	17,150	16,247	29,777	28,630
Czechia	24,070	25,732	42,955	40,360
Denmark	68,110	67,218	61,478	62,180
Estonia	25,970	26,470	39,729	37,940
Finland	53,660	54,330	51,866	51,650
France	43,880 (Note: Data include the French overseas departments of French Guiana, Guadeloupe, Martinique and Réunion.)	44,995	49,492	50,400
Germany	51,040	51,860	56,955	55,220
Greece	20,140	19,673	30,494	30,620
Hungary	17,740	18,075	35,088	33,070
Iceland	64,410	65,273	58,151	59,590
Ireland	74,520	94,556	99,238	69,190
Italy	35,710	34,997	43,375	42,270
Kazakhstan	9,470	12,306	32,688	24,970
Kosovo	4,970	4,401	11,948	11,650
Latvia	19,370	19,824	33,393	31,590
Liechtenstein	n/d	n/d	n/d	n/d
Lithuania	21,610	22,245	40,784	37,420
Luxembourg	81,110	131,782	122,740	74,310
Malta	30,560	31,576	45,041	38,800
Moldova	5,460	4,638	13,878	13,520
Monaco	n/d	n/d	n/d	n/d
Montenegro	9,300	9,064	21,354	20,870
Netherlands	56,370	58,003	60,460	59,700
North Macedonia	6,130	6,657	17,663	16,280
Norway	84,090	81,995	69,171	66,020
Poland	16,670	16,930	35,957	33,220
Portugal	23,730	25,065	36,078	33,980
Romania	14,170	14,968	32,950	31,410
Russia	11,600	11,654	29,485	27,550
San Marino	n/d	n/d	n/d	n/d
Serbia	8,440	8,748	20,544	18,650
Slovakia	20,250	21,529	34,815	31,290
Slovenia	28,240	28,104	40,820	40,530
Spain	29,740	30,996	41,545	42,250
Sweden	58,890	58,977	55,566	56,270
Switzerland	90,360	94,696	75,880	73,620
Ukraine	4,120	3,984	13,943	13,260
United Kingdom	45,380	46,344	47,089	47,620

high income ($13,205 or more)
upper middle income ($4,256 and $13,205)
lower middle income ($1,086 and $4,255)

== See also ==
- World Bank high-income economy
- International organisations in Europe
- List of European countries by budget revenues
- List of European countries by budget revenues per capita
- List of European countries by GDP (nominal) per capita
- List of European countries by Real GDP per capita
- List of European countries by GDP (PPP) per capita
- List of European countries by GNI (PPP) per capita
- List of sovereign states in Europe by net average wage
- List of countries by GDP (nominal) per capita
- List of countries by GDP (PPP) per capita
- List of countries by GDP (nominal)
- List of countries by GDP (PPP)
- List of countries by GNI (nominal) per capita
