= List of sovereign states in Europe by GDP (nominal) per capita =

Map of the (transcontinental) European countries by GDP (nominal) per capita in 2024: ≥ 60,000 ≥ 30,000 ≥ 10,000 < 10,000

This is a list and map of European states by GDP per capita.

The figures presented do not take into account differences in the cost of living in different countries, and the results vary greatly from one year to another based on fluctuations in the exchange rates of the country's currency. Such fluctuations change a country's ranking from one year to the next, even though they often make little or no difference to the standard of living of its population. GDP per capita is often considered an indicator of a country's standard of living; with limitations, as GDP per capita is not a measure of personal income.

== List of sovereign states in Europe by GDP (nominal) per capita ==
This is a sortable list of all European countries by their gross domestic product in millions of US dollars at market or official government exchange rates (nominal) per capita, according to the International Monetary Fund. Data for Monaco and Liechtenstein are taken from World Bank Data. The economic and political map of Europe also includes: Turkey, Georgia, Armenia, Azerbaijan, Cyprus and Kosovo.

Country	2031 (project.)	2026	2020	2010	2000
Monaco			176,892	161,854	81,789
Liechtenstein	259,929	226,809	163,998	141,090	76,088
Luxembourg	175,281	158,733	117,570	112,049	48,984
Ireland	159,213	140,186	86,217	48,636	26,187
Switzerland	148,483	126,177	87,797	76,848	38,987
Iceland	125,283	110,048	62,237	43,293	32,344
Norway	105,025	105,877	70,990	87,824	38,095
Denmark	97,741	83,445	61,076	58,240	30,777
Netherlands	92,176	79,918	53,529	51,473	26,339
San Marino	80,909	70,187	45,641	60,426	37,601
Sweden	85,389	70,676	52,438	52,334	29,597
Austria	77,918	67,761	48,764	46,662	24,498
United Kingdom	75,761	61,056	40,844	39,642	28,339
Germany	76,426	65,303	47,954	43,233	24,158
Belgium	73,357	65,112	45,934	44,461	23,137
Finland	71,894	60,130	48,827	46,648	24,370
Malta	65,745	53,560	31,837	21,990	10,398
France	58,797	52,083	39,231	40,989	22,502
Cyprus	57,180	45,409	28,296	31,522	14,465
Andorra	57,377	53,475	36,974	49,030	21,810
Italy	53,589	46,505	31,957	35,964	20,206
Slovenia	49,918	40,630	25,451	23,367	10,194
Spain	49,205	41,563	27,188	30,624	14,714
Czech Republic	49,158	39,795	23,464	20,184	6,049
Lithuania	46,955	36,545	20,407	11,847	3,298
Estonia	47,877	37,718	23,915	14,697	4,085
Portugal	43,408	35,434	22,093	22,570	11,531
Poland	40,778	31,336	15,963	12,574	4,499
Slovakia	39,649	31,242	19,723	16,916	3,836
Croatia	37,558	30,030	14,797	13,744	5,055
Hungary	36,767	28,430	16,356	13,171	4,625
Latvia	37,605	28,913	17,484	11,086	3,260
Greece	36,102	29,696	17,839	26,680	11,827
Bulgaria	33,625	23,848	10,207	6,754	1,625
Romania	35,828	25,693	12,984	8,393	1,668
Serbia	25,291	17,252	8,099	5,907	1,388
Turkey	22,955	19,018	8,759	10,629	4,250
Kazakhstan	23,166	17,503	9,122	9,070	1,229
Montenegro	21,214	16,377	7,549	6,688	1,627
Russia	18,484	18,525	10,167	11,432	1,898
Albania	17,353	12,493	5,381	4,147	1,142
North Macedonia	16,354	11,967	6,673	4,837	1,878
Moldova	15,334	9,354	4,361	2,428	448
Georgia	18,353	11,574	4,308	3,270	764
Bosnia and Herzegovina	14,084	10,701	5,811	4,637	1,484
Armenia	14,501	10,410	4,267	3,122	621
Kosovo	12,483	8,958	4,298	3,013	1,506
Belarus	15,138	11,286	6,537	6,033	1,080
Azerbaijan	9,507	7,467	4,280	5,881	656
Ukraine	8,757	6,980	3,781	2,983	664

== Map of sovereign states in Europe by projected 2026 GDP nominal per capita based on USD exchange rate ==
The map data is for year 2026 using IMF data (WEO April 2026 Edition) GDP nominal per capita - current international dollar.

>$50,000 $25,000 - $50,000 <$25,000

== Map of sovereign states in Europe by 2000 GDP nominal per capita based on USD exchange rate ==
The map data is for year 2000 using IMF data (WEO April 2026 Edition) GDP nominal per capita - current international dollar.

>$20,000 $10,000 - $20,000 <$10,000

== See also ==
- List of sovereign states in Europe by GDP (PPP) per capita
- List of European countries by Real GDP per capita
- International organisations in Europe
- List of European countries by budget revenues
- List of European countries by budget revenues per capita
