= List of European countries by membership in international organisations =

A darker shade indicates a higher level of integration in international organisations.

This list depicts the membership of European countries in selected international organisations and treaties.

== Table ==
State (51)	HDI	GNI	GDP	UN	CoE	OSCE	ICC	WTO	EU	EEA	EUCU	Schengen	€	NATO	OECD	VWP
Albania	0.810	12,060	13,968	UN	CoE	OSCE	ICC	WTO	Candidate negotiating				ALL	NATO		
Andorra	0.913	53,230	53,988	UN	CoE	OSCE	ICC	Observer			EUCU ^{1}	Schengen ^{2}	€ ^{4}			VWP
Armenia	0.811	9,020	10,662	UN	CoE	OSCE	ICC	WTO					AMD	PfP		
Austria	0.930	60,360	67,020	UN	CoE	OSCE	ICC	WTO	EU	EEA	EUCU	Schengen	€	PfP	OECD	VWP
Azerbaijan	0.789	7,360	8,497	UN	CoE	OSCE		Observer					AZN	PfP		
Belarus	0.824	9,160	11,963	UN		OSCE		Observer					BYR			
Belgium	0.951	59,500	64,774	UN	CoE	OSCE	ICC	WTO	EU	EEA	EUCU	Schengen	€	NATO	OECD	VWP
Bosnia and Herzegovina	0.804	9,940	10,845	UN	CoE	OSCE	ICC	Observer	Candidate				BAM	MAP		
Bulgaria	0.845	17,780	23,000	UN	CoE	OSCE	ICC	WTO	EU	EEA	EUCU	Schengen	€	NATO	Candidate	
Croatia	0.889	25,360	29,860	UN	CoE	OSCE	ICC	WTO	EU	EEA	EUCU	Schengen	€	NATO	Candidate	VWP
Cyprus	0.913	36,110	44,477	UN	CoE	OSCE	ICC	WTO	EU	EEA	EUCU	EU EEA CH freedom of movement	€			
Czechia	0.915	32,960	39,614	UN	CoE	OSCE	ICC	WTO	EU	EEA	EUCU	Schengen	CZK	NATO	OECD	VWP
Denmark	0.962	77,190	82,714	UN	CoE	OSCE	ICC	WTO	EU	EEA	EUCU	Schengen	DKK ^{6}	NATO	OECD	VWP
Estonia	0.905	32,310	37,310	UN	CoE	OSCE	ICC	WTO	EU	EEA	EUCU	Schengen	€	NATO	OECD	VWP
Finland	0.948	55,250	60,156	UN	CoE	OSCE	ICC	WTO	EU	EEA	EUCU	Schengen	€	NATO	OECD	VWP
France	0.920	48,630	51,448	UN	CoE	OSCE	ICC	WTO	EU	EEA	EUCU	Schengen	€	NATO	OECD	VWP
Georgia	0.844	8,990	11,234	UN	CoE	OSCE	ICC	WTO	Candidate				GEL	PfP		
Germany	0.959	60,200	65,699	UN	CoE	OSCE	ICC	WTO	EU	EEA	EUCU	Schengen	€	NATO	OECD	VWP
Greece	0.908	25,360	29,413	UN	CoE	OSCE	ICC	WTO	EU	EEA	EUCU	Schengen	€	NATO	OECD	VWP
Hungary	0.870	23,850	27,884	UN	CoE	OSCE	ICC	WTO	EU	EEA	EUCU	Schengen	HUF	NATO	OECD	VWP
Iceland	0.972	89,220	107,464	UN	CoE	OSCE	ICC	WTO		EEA		Schengen	ISK	NATO	OECD	VWP
Ireland	0.949	87,360	127,837	UN	CoE	OSCE	ICC	WTO	EU	EEA	EUCU	EU EEA CH freedom of movement	€	PfP	OECD	VWP
Italy	0.915	42,080	45,886	UN	CoE	OSCE	ICC	WTO	EU	EEA	EUCU	Schengen	€	NATO	OECD	VWP
Kazakhstan	0.837	13,740	19,311	UN		OSCE		WTO					KZT	PfP		
Kosovo	n/d	7,760	8,902		Applicant				Applicant				€ ^{5}			
Latvia	0.889	24,980	28,630	UN	CoE	OSCE	ICC	WTO	EU	EEA	EUCU	Schengen	€	NATO	OECD	VWP
Liechtenstein	0.938	116,380	230,417	UN	CoE	OSCE	ICC	WTO		EEA		Schengen	CHF			VWP
Lithuania	0.895	30,500	36,135	UN	CoE	OSCE	ICC	WTO	EU	EEA	EUCU	Schengen	€	NATO	OECD	VWP
Luxembourg	0.922	95,720	155,733	UN	CoE	OSCE	ICC	WTO	EU	EEA	EUCU	Schengen	€	NATO	OECD	VWP
Malta	0.924	41,440	52,149	UN	CoE	OSCE	ICC	WTO	EU	EEA	EUCU	Schengen	€	PfP	Applicant	VWP
Moldova	0.785	8,050	9,497	UN	CoE	OSCE	ICC	WTO	Candidate negotiating				MDL	PfP		
Monaco	n/d	n/d	n/d	UN	CoE	OSCE	Signatory				EUCU ^{1}	Schengen ^{2}	€ ^{4}			VWP
Montenegro	0.862	14,150	16,211	UN	CoE	OSCE	ICC	WTO	Candidate negotiating				€ ^{5}	NATO		
Netherlands	0.955	68,530	78,535	UN	CoE	OSCE	ICC	WTO	EU	EEA	EUCU	Schengen	€	NATO	OECD	VWP
North Macedonia	0.815	9,490	11,762	UN	CoE	OSCE	ICC	WTO	Candidate negotiating				MKD	NATO		
Norway	0.970	97,310	115,188	UN	CoE	OSCE	ICC	WTO		EEA		Schengen	NOK	NATO	OECD	VWP
Poland	0.906	25,520	31,186	UN	CoE	OSCE	ICC	WTO	EU	EEA	EUCU	Schengen	PLN	NATO	OECD	VWP
Portugal	0.890	29,930	34,815	UN	CoE	OSCE	ICC	WTO	EU	EEA	EUCU	Schengen	€	NATO	OECD	VWP
Romania	0.845	20,190	24,741	UN	CoE	OSCE	ICC	WTO	EU	EEA	EUCU	Schengen	RON	NATO	Candidate	
Russia	0.832	15,960	19,953	UN		OSCE		WTO					₽			
San Marino	0.915	53,910	70,662	UN	CoE	OSCE	ICC				EUCU ^{1}	Schengen ^{2}	€ ^{4}			VWP
Serbia	0.833	13,480	17,126	UN	CoE	OSCE	ICC	Observer	Candidate negotiating				RSD	PfP		
Slovakia	0.880	26,410	30,884	UN	CoE	OSCE	ICC	WTO	EU	EEA	EUCU	Schengen	€	NATO	OECD	VWP
Slovenia	0.931	35,520	41,631	UN	CoE	OSCE	ICC	WTO	EU	EEA	EUCU	Schengen	€	NATO	OECD	VWP
Spain	0.918	37,120	41,756	UN	CoE	OSCE	ICC	WTO	EU	EEA	EUCU	Schengen	€	NATO	OECD	VWP
Sweden	0.959	63,010	69,244	UN	CoE	OSCE	ICC	WTO	EU	EEA	EUCU	Schengen	SEK	NATO	OECD	VWP
Switzerland	0.970	110,330	124,478	UN	CoE	OSCE	ICC	WTO		bilat ^{3}		Schengen	CHF	PfP	OECD	VWP
Turkey	0.853	16,300	21,079	UN	CoE	OSCE		WTO	Candidate with frozen negotiations		EUCU ^{1}		TRY	NATO	OECD	
Ukraine	0.779	5,510	7,075	UN	CoE	OSCE	ICC	WTO	Candidate negotiating				UAH	Applicant	Applicant	
United Kingdom	0.946	54,550	61,108	UN	CoE	OSCE	ICC	WTO					£	NATO	OECD	VWP
Vatican City	n/d	n/d	n/d	Observer	Observer	OSCE		Observer				Schengen ^{2}	€ ^{4}			

Classification of countries according to the United Nations:

Very high human development (0.800 or higher)
High human development (0.700 - 0.799)

Classification of countries according to the World Bank:

high income (> $13,935)
upper middle income ($4,496 - $13,935)

Classification of countries according to the IMF:

Advanced Economies
Emerging Market and Developing Economies

^{1} These countries are currently not participating in the EU's single market (EEA), but the EU has common external Customs Union agreements with Turkey (EU-Turkey Customs Union in force since 1995), Andorra (since 1991) and San Marino (since 2002). Monaco participates in the EU customs union through its relationship with France; its ports are administered by the French. Vatican City has a customs union in effect with Italy.
^{2} Andorra, Monaco, San Marino and Vatican City are not members of Schengen, but act as such via their open borders with Spain, France and Italy, respectively.
^{3} Switzerland is not a member of EEA but has bilateral agreements largely with the same content. The most noticeable difference is that roaming charges still apply.
^{4} Andorra, Monaco, San Marino and Vatican City are using the euro as their currency through a monetary agreement with the EU.
^{5} Montenegro and Kosovo unilaterally adopted the euro as their currency and, therefore, have no issuing rights.
^{6} Currency included in the ERM II mechanism.

== Maps ==
Council of Europe

Organization for Security and Co-operation in Europe

European Union

North Atlantic Treaty Organization

== See also ==
- Co-ordinated organisations
- Euronest Parliamentary Assembly
- European integration
- International organization
- List of countries in Europe
- List of European countries by life expectancy
- List of European countries by number of internet users
- List of European countries by budget revenues
- List of European countries by GNI (nominal) per capita
- List of sovereign states in Europe by net average wage
- List of conflicts in Europe
- List of international rankings
- Organization for Security and Co-operation in Europe statistics
- Politics of Europe
