= List of European Union member states by health expense per person =

This is a list of European Union member states by health expense per person.

== Map ==
The table uses 2013 data from the World Bank. Numbers are in international dollar.

== Table ==
The table uses an interval of years from the World Bank. Numbers are in international dollars.

EU member state	2010	2011	2012	2013	2014
Austria	4,531	4,677	4,863	4,889	5,039
Belgium	3,906	4,166	4,237	4,262	4,391
Bulgaria	1,088	1,070	1,131	1,270	1,398
Croatia	1,606	1,601	1,643	1,666	1,652
Cyprus	2,270	2,313	2,215	2,112	2,062
Czech Republic	1,929	2,041	2,057	2,064	2,146
Denmark	4 545	4 554	4 615	4 552	
Estonia	1 300	1 356	1 416	1 453	
Finland	3 297	3 463	3 497	3 604	
France	4 039	4 202	4 213	4 334	
Germany	4 426	4 612	4 635	4 812	
Greece	2 685	2 648	2 355	2 513	
Hungary	1 701	1 798	1 766	1 839	
(Republic of Ireland) Ireland	3 796	3 748	3 817	3 867	
Italy	3,275	3,330	3,304	3,257	3,238
Latvia	804	830	869	894	940
Lithuania	1,387	1,532	1,584	1,668	1,718
Luxembourg	6,519	6,701	6,514	6,566	6,812
Malta	2,327	2,762	2,530	2,652	
Netherlands	4,698	4,894	5,115	5,169	5,201
Poland	1,437	1,509	1,544	1,529	1,570
Portugal	2,810	2,708	2,624	2,634	2,689
Romania	964	971	1,005	1,070	1,079
Slovakia	2,039	1,963	2,064	2,080	2,179
Slovenia	2,452	2,539	2,617	2,619	2,697
Spain	2,996	3,018	2,997	2,928	2,965
Sweden	3,761	4,886	5,007	5,177	5,218

== See also ==
- List of European Union member states by minimum wage
- List of European Union member states by average wage
- Economy of the European Union

=== Plotted maps ===
- European countries by electricity consumption per person
- European countries by employment in agriculture (% of employed)
- European countries by fossil fuel use (% of total energy)
- European countries by military expenditure as a percentage of government expenditure
- European countries by percent of population aged 0-14
- European countries by percentage of urban population
- European countries by percentage of women in national parliaments
- List of sovereign states in Europe by life expectancy
- List of sovereign states in Europe by number of Internet users
