= List of European countries by average wage =

This is the map and list of European countries by monthly average wage (annual divided by 12 months), gross and net income (after taxes) for full-time employees in their local currency and in euros. The chart below reflects the average (mean) wage as reported by various data providers, like Eurostat. The salary distribution is right-skewed, therefore more than 50% of people earn less than the average gross salary. Thus, median figures might be more representative than averages.

These figures will shrink after income tax is applied. In some countries, social security, contributions for pensions, public schools, and health are included in these taxes. In certain countries, actual incomes may exceed those listed in the table due to the existence of grey economies.

== Maps ==
=== Gross average monthly earnings ===
The countries and territories on the map have gross average monthly earnings (taxable income) for full-time employees of:

Purple	above €6,000
Green	€3,000 to €5,999
Blue	€2,000 to €2,999
Orange	€1,000 to €1,999
Red	below €1,000

=== Net average monthly salary ===
The countries and territories have a net average monthly salary of:

Purple	above €3,000
Green	€2,000 to €2,999
Blue	€1,000 to €1,999
Orange	€600 to €999
Red	below €600

=== Net average monthly salary (adjusted for living costs in PPP) ===
The countries and territories on the map have a net average monthly salary (adjusted for living costs in PPP) of:

Purple	above $4,000
Green	$3,000 to $3,999
Blue	$2,000 to $2,999
Orange	$1,500 to $1,999
Red	below $1,500

== European and transcontinental countries by monthly average wage ==
Country names displayed in italics represent transcontinental states (part of both Europe and Asia).

Country	Monthly average wage					Net-to- gross ratio	Exchange rate to €	Date (quarter)
Country	Local currency		Euro		US dollar, PPP-converted (Note: Formula: Net amount in local currency / (divided by) PPP conversion rate. The value is expressed in international dollars (Geary–Khamis dollar).)	Net-to- gross ratio	Exchange rate to €	Date (quarter)
Country	Gross	Net	Gross	Net	Net	Net-to- gross ratio	Exchange rate to €	Date (quarter)
Albania	L92,150	L73,749	903	723	1,533	0.80	0.0098	2026 (Q2)
Andorra	€2,514.84	€2,351.38	2,515	2,351	3,679	0.93	1	2024-09
Armenia	֏ 308,927	֏ 225,895	679	497	1,425	0.73	0.0022	2026-09
(European Union) Austria	€5,497	€3,778	5,497	3,778	5,244	0.69	1	2024
Azerbaijan	₼1,173	₼1,011	587	506	1,862	0.86	0.5006	2026-08
Belarus	Br 3,099	Br 2,669	859	740	3,146	0.86	0.2773	2026-09
(European Union) Belgium	€4,076	€2,631	4,076	2,631	3,377	0.65	1	2022
Bosnia and Herzegovina	KM 2,750	KM 1,757	1,407	900	2,286	0.64	0.4906	2026-07
(European Union) Bulgaria	€1,443	€1,120	1,443	1,120	2,701	0.78	1	2026 (Q2)
(European Union) Croatia	€2,183	€1,555	2,180	1,543	2,986	0.71	1	2026-08
(European Union) Cyprus	€2,932	€2,389	2,932	2,389	4,034	0.84	1	2025 (Q4)
(European Union) Czech Republic	51,966 Kč	40,707 Kč	2,144	1,680	2,777	0.79	0.0413	2026 (Q2)
(European Union) Denmark	DKK 51,675	DKK 34,849	6,925	4,670	5,152	0.64	0.134	2024
(European Union) Estonia	€2,215	€1,820	2,215	1,820	2,709	0.77	1	2026-03
(European Union) Finland	€4,304	€3,133	4,304	3,133	3,906	0.59	1	2026 (Q2)
(European Union) France	€3,693	€2,797	3,693	2,797	3,812	0.76	1	2025
(Georgia (country)) Georgia	₾2,389	₾1,911	742	593	1,758	0.80	0.3104	2026 (Q2)
(European Union) Germany (Note: Excluding special payments)	€4,851	€3,008	4,851	3,008	4,184	0.62	1	2025
(European Union) Greece	€1,415	€1,098	1,415	1,098	1,893	0.79	1	2025 (Q1)
(European Union) Hungary	764,100 Ft	546,000 Ft	1,984	1,418	2,669	0.70	0.0026	2026-05
Iceland	845,000 kr	577,990 kr	5,660	3,871	3,704	0.68	0.0067	2024
(Republic of Ireland) (European Union) Ireland	€5,307	€3,349	5,307	3,349	3,705	0.79	1	2025 (Q4)
(European Union) Italy	€2,791	€2,017	2,791	2,017	3,194	0.72	1	2023
Kazakhstan	₸461,486	₸378,472	754	618	1,982	0.82	0.0016	2026 (Q1)
Kosovo (Note: State with limited recognition)	€713	€636	713	636	1,647	0.86	1	2025
(European Union) Latvia	€1,886	€1,401	1,886	1,401	2,537	0.74	1	2026 (Q2)
(European Union) Lithuania	€2,628	€1,595	2,628	1,595	2,902	0.61	1	2026 (Q2)
(European Union) Luxembourg	€6,118	€4,086	6,118	4,086	4,810	0.66	1	2023
(European Union) Malta	€1,833	€1,507	1,833	1,507	2,581	0.79	1	2024 (Q4)
Moldova (Note: At economic units with 4 or more employees)	L 16,896	L 13,530	828	663	1,542	0.80	0.049	2026 (Q2)
Montenegro	€1,242	€1,040	1,242	1,040	2,369	0.84	1	2026-08
(European Union) Netherlands	€5,190	€3,771	5,190	3,771	5,063	0.72	1	2023
North Macedonia	ден 73,336	ден 48,733	1,142	759	2,213	0.66	0.0156	2026-08
Norway	NOK 62,070	NOK 45,340	5,241	3,828	4,533	0.73	0.0844	2025
(European Union) Poland	9,509zł	6,497zł	2,253	1,539	3,149	0.68	0.2369	2026-07
(European Union) Portugal	€2,190	€1,496	2,190	1,496	2,603	0.68	1	2025 (Q4)
(European Union) Romania	RON 9,902	RON 5,938	1,943	1,165	2,723	0.60	0.1962	2026-03
Russia	103,014 ₽	89,622 ₽	1,048	912	2,914	0.87	0.0102	2026-08
San Marino	€2,629	€2,629	2,629	2,629	3,558	1	1	2024-10
Serbia	din. 165,866	din. 120,201	1,414	1,025	2,271	0.72	0.0082	2026 (Q2)
(European Union) Slovakia	€1,611	€1,211	1,611	1,211	2,141	0.76	1	2025 (Q4)
(European Union) Slovenia	€2,751	€1,723	2,751	1,723	2,907	0.62	1	2026-06
(European Union) Spain	€2,818	€2,136	2,818	2,136	3,630	0.76	1	2024
(European Union) Sweden	SEK 42,900	SEK 34,350	3,964	3,174	3,864	0.80	0.0874	2025
Switzerland	CHF 8,510	CHF 6,928	8,759	7,132	5,969	0.81	1.0293	2023
Turkey	₺37,800	₺20,920	1,474	816	2,718	0.55	0.039	2023
Ukraine	₴33,153	₴25,528 (Note: Standard tax rate of 18% plus military tax rate of 5% applied to gross wage)	677	521	2,152	0.77	0.0204	2026-09
United Kingdom (Note: Annual Survey for Hours and Earnings (ASHE) full-time mean total)	£4,195	£3,050	4,807	3,495	4,348	0.73	1.146	2025-04

Notes:

- Excluding social and private benefits

== Average monthly gross wage (1998–2018) ==
Country
Country	in EUR (€)																				
Country	1998	1999	2000	2001	2002	2003	2004	2005	2006	2007	2008	2009	2010	2011	2012	2013	2014	2015	2016	2017	2018
Albania	-	-	-	-	-	-	-	-	-	-	-	-	-	-	-	-	325	343	346	365	396
Armenia	-	35	46	49	50	53	66	91	120	159	194	189	207	208	219	269	287	323	328	326	303
Austria	-	-	-	-	-	-	2,988	3,086	3,191	3,277	3,410	3,492	3,540	3,625	3,728	3,817	3,880	3,973	4,081	4,164	4,261
Belgium	-	2,238	2,293	2,401	2,441	2,531	2,662	2,703	2,766	2,837	2,936	3,027	3,103	3,192	3,258	3,300	3,414	3,445	3,489	3,558	
Bosnia and Herzegovina	232	257	276	306	337	367	382	407	444	488	569	616	622	650	660	660	659	659	665	675	697
Bulgaria	94	103	115	123	132	140	150	166	184	220	279	311	331	351	374	396	420	449	485	530	586
Croatia	-	-	638	677	724	743	798	844	906	961	1,044	1,051	1,054	1,049	1,048	1,048	1,042	1,058	1,030	1,080	1,139
Cyprus	-	-	-	-	-	1,468	1,507	1,561	1,636	1,699	1,801	1,870	1,915	1,967	1,988	1,945	1,892	1,882	1,879	1,892	1,939
Czech Republic	-	-	371	422	504	516	547	616	690	755	906	883	944	995	997	964	936	975	1,027	1,126	1,243
Denmark	-	-	-	-	-	-	-	-	-	-	-	5,799	4,960	5,037	5,144	5,190	5,246	5,331	5,412	5,531	5,626
Estonia	-	-	314	352	393	430	466	516	601	725	825	784	792	839	887	949	1,005	1,065	1,146	1,221	1,310
Finland	-	-	-	-	-	-	-	2,555	2,634	2,734	2,876	2,971	3,040	3,109	3,206	3,284	3,308	3,333	3,368	3,395	3,465
Georgia	-	-	-	51	55	52	66	90	125	161	244	239	253	271	336	350	349	357	359	353	376
Germany	2,447	2,518	2,551	2,617	2,701	2,783	2,846	2,901	2,950	3,023	3,103	3,141	3,227	3,311	3,391	3,449	3,527	3,612	3,703	3,771	3,880
Hungary	281	305	337	403	504	541	578	638	648	736	792	712	735	763	771	777	770	800	845	961	1,035
Iceland	-	-	-	-	-	-	-	-	-	-	3,358	2,461	2,662	2,850	3,036	3,239	3,636	4,183	4,963	5,865	5,645
Ireland	-	-	-	-	-	-	-	-	-	-	3,682	3,698	3,697	3,669	3,708	3,726	3,736	3,755	3,803	3,867	3,966
Kazakhstan	-	91	107	131	140	137	168	206	258	313	343	327	397	441	528	540	508	513	377	409	400
Kosovo	-	-	-	-	-	-	-	-	-	-	-	-	-	-	431	444	482	510	519	528	558
Latvia	190	201	213	227	246	274	300	350	430	566	682	655	633	660	685	716	765	818	859	926	1,004
Lithuania	-	-	281	285	294	311	333	370	433	522	623	596	576	593	615	646	677	714	774	840	924
Luxembourg	-	-	-	-	-	-	-	3,647	3,776	3,909	4,051	4,168	4,276	4,376	4,487	4,616	4,734	4,811	4,848	5,007	5,143
Malta	-	-																			
Moldova	-	-	35	47	54	57	72	84	103	124	165	177	181	196	223	225	224	221	231	274	325
Montenegro	-	-	158	176	251	271	303	326	433	497	609	643	715	722	727	726	723	725	751	765	766
North Macedonia	-	-	-	-	-	-	-	-	378	396	430	491	495	500	501	500	510	525	535	549	579
Norway	-	2,709	2,911	3,069	3,511	3,406	3,374	3,642	3,793	4,025	4,149	4,044	4,584	4,889	5,298	5,251	5,064	4,758	4,661	4,751	4,753
Poland	319	404	480	562	553	501	505	591	636	711	837	717	807	825	841	870	904	932	928	1,003	1,076
Portugal	678	700	729	-	817	850	878	907	934	963	1,008	1,034	1,075	1,084	1,095	1,093	1,093	1,097	1,108	1,133	1,170
Romania	149	118	142	162	170	177	202	275	325	418	478	435	452	467	463	489	524	575	626	706	965
Serbia	-	-	-	-	218	255	283	307	377	485	561	470	460	517	508	537	524	506	516	544	580
Slovakia	-	-	379	410	485	510	566	614	656	719	773	745	769	786	805	824	858	883	912	954	1,013
Slovenia	-	-	-	-	-	-	-	1,157	1,213	1,285	1,391	1,439	1,495	1,525	1,525	1,523	1,540	1,556	1,585	1,627	1,682
Spain	-	-	1,443	1,493	1,550	1,670	1,718	1,764	1,832	1,937	2,014	2,065	2,126	2,157	2,169	2,183	2,206	2,204	2,213	2,243	2,295
Sweden	2,083	2,203	2,403	2,302	2,412	2,499	2,586	2,617	2,701	2,790	2,821	2,627	2,977	3,210	3,423	3,538	3,452	3,420	3,463	3,499	3,373
Ukraine	55	41	46	65	75	77	89	126	164	195	234	175	214	239	296	309	221	173	183	237	276
United Kingdom	-	2,660	3,054	3,163	3,262	3,068	3,220	3,342	3,445	3,522	3,172	2,904	3,021	3,033	3,268	3,177	3,371	3,773	3,442	2,451	2,389

== Gross, net and PPP (2000–2018) ==
Country
Country	Average monthly salary														
Country	Gross EUR					Net EUR					Net PPP in $				
Country	2000	2005	2009	2014	2018	2000	2005	2009	2014	2018	2000	2005	2009	2014	2018
Albania				325	396										
Armenia	46	91	189	287	303										
Azerbaijan		105	266	426	271										
Belgium	2,293	2,703	3,027												
Bosnia and Herzegovina	276	407	616	659	697	190	275	404	424	449	616	846	1,099	1,194	1,252
Bulgaria	115	166	311	420	580	90	130	244	329	450	384	490	750	1,018	1,325
Croatia	638	844	1,051	1,042	1,139	436	591	724	725	842	1,010	1,236	1,386	1,502	1,755
Cyprus		1,561	1,870	1,895	1,939										
Czech Republic	371	547	883	936	1,243										
Estonia	314	516	784	1,005	1,310	246	411	637	799	1,098	676	981	1,264	1,445	1,900
Finland		2,555	2,971	3,308	3,465										
France						1,626	1,825	2,003	2,194		1,844	2,107	2,342	2,676	
Georgia		90	239	349	376										
Germany															
Greece															
Hungary	337	638	712	770	1,035	215	416	442	504	688	613	928	1,017	1,209	1,627
Iceland					5,393					3,665					
Ireland			3,698	3,736	3,966										
Italy	1,771	2,074	2,262	2,381	2,464										
Kazakhstan	107	206	327	508	400										
Kosovo				482	558				430	498					
Latvia	213	350	655	765	1,004	154	250	486	560	742	478	649	1,006	1,118	1,455
Lithuania	281	370	596	677	924	201	266	464	527	720	506	690	1,067	1,166	1,548
Malta															
Montenegro	158	326	643	723	766	97	213	463	477	511	456	745	1,251	1,321	1,320
North Macedonia			491	510	579	168	206	326	347	395	591	727	1,095	1,130	1,200
Poland	480	623	766	957	1,134	329	402	515	649	765					
Portugal	729	907	1,034	1,093	1,170										
Romania	142	275	435	524	965	107	212	321	382	579	472	684	877	1,014	1,474
Russia	86	245	423	665	574	75	213	368	578	499	265	584	1,157	1,346	1,647
Serbia		307	470	524	580		210	338	380	420	267	690	949	1,101	1,204
Slovakia	379	614	745	858	1,013										
Slovenia		1,157	1,439	1,540	1,682		736	930	1,005	1,093		1,206	1,440	1,656	1,815
Spain	1,443	1,764	2,065	2,206	2,295										
Sweden	2,403	2,617	2,627	3,452	3,373										
Ukraine	46	126	175	221	276										
United Kingdom															

== See also ==
- List of countries by wealth per adult
- List of European countries by minimum wage
- List of countries by GDP (nominal) per capita
- List of countries by GDP (PPP) per capita
- European countries by electricity consumption per person
- European countries by health expense per person
- European countries by percentage of urban population
- List of European countries by life expectancy
- List of U.S. states by minimum wage
- List of U.S. states and territories by median wage and mean wage
- List of American countries by average wage
- List of Asian countries by average wage
- List of Oceanian countries by average wage
