= European countries by health expense per person =

This is a list of total public and private health expenditure for European countries, divided by the population of the country to give expenditure per capita. It includes health services, family planning, nutrition activities, and emergency health aid.

== Map ==
The table uses 2013 data from the World Bank. Numbers are in international dollars.

== Health expense per person by European country ==
The table uses an interval of years from the World Bank. Numbers are in international dollars.

Country	2010	2011	2012	2013	2014
Albania	498	555	544	564	615
Andorra	3,325	2,788	3,426	5,564	4,272
Austria	4,531	4,677	4,863	4,889	5,039
Belarus	853	816	859	1,068	1,031
Belgium	3,906	4,166	4,237	4,262	4,391
Bosnia and Herzegovina	855	915	947	919	957
Bulgaria	1,088	1,070	1,131	1,270	1,398
Croatia	1,606	1,601	1,643	1,666	1,652
Cyprus	2,270	2,313	2,215	2,112	2,062
Czech Republic	1,929	2,041	2,057	2,064	2,146
Denmark	4 545	4 554	4 615	4 552	
Estonia	1 300	1 356	1 416	1 453	
Finland	3 297	3 463	3 497	3 604	
France	4 039	4 202	4 213	4 334	
Germany	4 426	4 612	4 635	4 812	
Greece	2 685	2 648	2 355	2 513	
Hungary	1 701	1 798	1 766	1 839	
Iceland	3 415	3 469	3 485	3 646	
(Republic of Ireland) Ireland	3 796	3 748	3 817	3 867	
Italy	3,275	3,330	3,304	3,257	3,238
Latvia	804	830	869	894	940
Lithuania	1,387	1,532	1,584	1,668	1,718
Luxembourg	6,519	6,701	6,514	6,566	6,812
(North Macedonia) Republic of Macedonia	797	769	803	757	851
Malta	2,327	2,762	2,530	2,652	
Moldova	464	443	501	471	514
Montenegro	916	970	979	903	888
Netherlands	4,698	4,894	5,115	5,169	5,201
Norway	5,475	5,769	6,116	6,204	6,346
Poland	1,437	1,509	1,544	1,529	1,570
Portugal	2,810	2,708	2,624	2,634	2,689
Romania	964	971	1,005	1,070	1,079
Serbia	1,193	1,222	1,266	1,317	1,312
Slovakia	2,039	1,963	2,064	2,080	2,179
Slovenia	2,452	2,539	2,617	2,619	2,697
Spain	2,996	3,018	2,997	2,928	2,965
Sweden	3,761	4,886	5,007	5,177	5,218
Switzerland	5,394	5,818	6,173	6,364	6,468
Ukraine	603	581	636	665	584
United Kingdom	3,268	3,255	3,322	3,374	3,376

=== Health expense per person by transcontinental country ===
The following list transcontinental countries that have main territories in Asia with small territories in Europe.

The table uses an interval of years from the World Bank. Numbers are in international dollars.

Country	2010	2011	2012	2013	2014
Azerbaijan					
(Georgia (country)) Georgia					
Kazakhstan					
Russia	1,397	1,489	1,653	1,777	1,835
Turkey	904	941	948	1,007	1,036

== See also ==
- List of countries by total health expenditure per capita
- Health spending as percent of gross domestic product (GDP) by country

=== Plotted maps ===
- European countries by electricity consumption per person
- European countries by employment in agriculture (% of employed)
- European countries by fossil fuel use (% of total energy)
- European countries by military expenditure as a percentage of government expenditure
- European countries by percent of population aged 0-14
- European countries by percentage of urban population
- European countries by percentage of women in national parliaments
- List of sovereign states in Europe by life expectancy
- List of sovereign states in Europe by number of Internet users
