= European countries by employment in agriculture (% of employed) =

This article presents data on agricultural employment in European countries.

== Map ==
The map uses the latest data from the World Bank as of August 2016. Numbers are in percentage.

== Table ==
The table uses data from the World Bank. Numbers are in percentage.

Country	2010	2011	2012
Albania	42		
Austria	5	5	5
Belgium	1	1	1
Bosnia and Herzegovina	19	19	20
Bulgaria	7	7	6
Croatia	15	15	14
Cyprus	4	4	3
Czech Republic	3	3	3
Denmark	2	2	3
Estonia	4	4	5
Finland	4	4	4
France	3	3	3
Germany	2	2	2
Greece	13	12	13
(Georgia (country)) Georgia	48	49	47
Hungary	5	5	5
Iceland	10	7	6
(Republic of Ireland) Ireland	12	10	9
Italy	4	4	4
Latvia	9	9	8
Lithuania	9	9	9
Luxembourg	1	1	1
North Macedonia	19	17	
Malta	1	1	1
Montenegro	6	6	6
Netherlands	3	3	
Norway	3	2	2
Poland	13	13	13
Portugal	11	10	11
Romania	30	29	29
Serbia	22	21	21
Slovenia	9	9	8
Spain	4	4	4
Sweden	2	2	2
Switzerland	3	3	4
Turkey	24	24	24
Ukraine	17	17	
United Kingdom	1	1	1

== See also ==
=== Plotted maps ===
- European countries by electricity consumption per person
- European countries by fossil fuel use (% of total energy)
- European countries by health expense per person
- European countries by military expenditure as a percentage of government expenditure
- European countries by percent of population aged 0-14
- European countries by percentage of urban population
- European countries by percentage of women in national parliaments
- List of sovereign states in Europe by life expectancy
- List of sovereign states in Europe by number of Internet users
