= List of European countries by number of internet users =

This article presents a map and a list of European countries by number of internet users.

== Map ==

Internet penetration in European countries in 2019
as a percentage of a country's population

== List ==
State (49)	% of population	Internet users	Year
Albania	73.5	2,160,000	2019
Andorra	98.9	76,242	2019
Armenia	72.4	2,126,716	2019
Austria	87.9	7,708,997	2019
Azerbaijan	79.8	7,991,630	2019
Belarus	79.7	7,521,628	2019
Belgium	93.9	10,857,126	2019
Bosnia and Herzegovina	80.8	2,828,846	2019
Bulgaria	66.7	4,663,065	2019
Croatia	91.5	3,787,838	2019
Cyprus	84.4	1,011,831	2019
Czech Republic	87.7	9,323,428	2019
Denmark	97.8	5,649,494	2019
Estonia	97.9	1,276,521	2019
Finland	94.0	5,225,678	2019
France	92.3	60,421,689	2019
(Georgia (country)) Georgia	68.1	2,658,311	2019
Germany	96.0	79,127,551	2019
Greece	72.9	8,115,397	2019
Hungary	89.0	8,588,776	2019
Iceland	99.0	337,194	2019
(Republic of Ireland) Ireland	91.9	4,453,436	2019
Italy	92.5	54,798,299	2019
Latvia	87.1	1,663,739	2019
Liechtenstein	98.1	37,674	2019
Lithuania	90.9	2,603,900	2019
Luxembourg	97.8	584,037	2019
North Macedonia	79.2	1,652,056	2019
Malta	83.1	360,056	2019
Moldova	76.1	3,067,446	2019
Monaco	97.5	38,124	2019
Montenegro	71.5	449,989	2019
Netherlands	95.6	16,383,879	2019
Norway	98.4	5,311,892	2019
Poland	78.2	29,757,099	2019
Portugal	78.2	8,015,519	2019
Romania	73.8	14,387,477	2019
Russia	80.9	116,353,942	2019
San Marino	60.2	20,270	2019
Serbia	73.4	6,406,827	2019
Slovakia	84.9	4,629,641	2019
Slovenia	79.9	1,663,795	2019
Spain	92.5	42,961,230	2019
Sweden	96.4	9,692,227	2019
Switzerland	93.7	8,066,800	2019
Turkey	83.3	69,107,183	2019
Ukraine	93.4	40,912,381	2019
United Kingdom	94.9	63,544,106	2019
Vatican City	60.1	480	2019

== See also ==
=== Plotted maps ===
- European countries by electricity consumption per person
- European countries by employment in agriculture (% of employed)
- European countries by fossil fuel use (% of total energy)
- European countries by health expense per person
- European countries by military expenditure as a percentage of government expenditure
- European countries by percent of population aged 0-14
- European countries by percentage of urban population
- European countries by percentage of women in national parliaments
- List of European countries by life expectancy
- List of countries by number of internet users
- List of European countries by budget revenues
- List of European countries by budget revenues per capita
- List of European countries by GDP (nominal) per capita
- List of European countries by GDP (PPP) per capita
- List of European countries by GNI (nominal) per capita
- List of European countries by GNI (PPP) per capita
- List of countries by GDP (nominal) per capita
- List of countries by GDP (PPP) per capita
- List of countries by GDP (nominal)
- List of countries by GDP (PPP)

=== Other ===
- International organisations in Europe
