= European countries by percent of population aged 0-14 =

The following is a map of European countries by the percentage of the population which is between 0 and 14. The most recent World Bank data available is from 2022. As of then, the average for the continent as a whole is 18%. This is one of the lowest rates in the world, compared with the average of 25%. Europe and Central Asia are tied for the lowers share of people 0-14 with North America, likely due to the high GDP of countries in those regions.

== Map ==
The map data are for the year 2022 from the World Bank. Numbers are in percentage.

== Table ==
The table data are for the year 2022 from the World Bank. Numbers are in percentage.

Country	2022
Albania	16
Austria	14
Armenia	21
Azerbaijan	24
Belarus	17
Belgium	17
Bosnia and Herzegovina	15
Bulgaria	14
Croatia	14
Cyprus	16
Czech Republic	16
Denmark	16
Estonia	16
Finland	15
France	17
Germany	14
Greece	14
(Georgia (country)) Georgia	20
Hungary	14
Iceland	18
(Republic of Ireland) Ireland	20
Italy	12
Latvia	16
Liechtenstein	14
Lithuania	15
Luxembourg	16
North Macedonia	16
Malta	13
Montenegro	18
Netherlands	15
Norway	17
Poland	15
Portugal	13
Romania	16
Russia	18
Serbia	14
Slovenia	15
Spain	14
Sweden	18
Switzerland	15
Turkey	23
Ukraine	15
United Kingdom	17

== See also ==
=== Plotted maps ===
- European countries by electricity consumption per person
- European countries by employment in agriculture (% of employed)
- European countries by fossil fuel use (% of total energy)
- European countries by health expense per person
- European countries by military expenditure as a percentage of government expenditure
- European countries by percentage of urban population
- European countries by percentage of women in national parliaments
- List of sovereign states in Europe by life expectancy
- List of sovereign states in Europe by number of Internet users
