= European countries by fossil fuel use (% of total energy) =

This article lists European countries by fossil fuel use, using the percentage of total energy.

== Map ==
The map data is from year 2022, where data is available, from the World Bank. Numbers are in percentage.

== Table ==
The table uses an interval of years from the World Bank. Numbers are in percentage.

| Country | 2010 | 2011 | 2012 | 2013 | 2014 | 2022 |
|---|---|---|---|---|---|---|
| Albania | 63.239 | 61.503 | 57.754 | 56.395 | 61.422 | 55.1 |
| Austria | 70.267 | 69.154 | 67.303 | 66.254 | 64.813 | 62.1 |
| Belarus | 91.996 | 91.392 | 91.047 | 90.672 | 92.440 | 86.6 |
| Belgium | 72.794 | 70.254 | 71.116 | 70.820 | 72.653 | 69.3 |
| Bosnia and Herzegovina | 91.653 | 93.997 | 91.948 | 92.504 | 77.522 | 78.8 |
| Bulgaria | 73.165 | 75.044 | 72.187 | 70.208 | 71.046 | 68.8 |
| Croatia | 74.295 | 74.637 | 72.238 | 71.303 | 70.704 | 68.0 |
| Cyprus | 95.391 | 94.894 | 94.166 | 92.991 | 92.906 | 86.5 |
| Czech Republic | 80.560 | 79.287 | 77.201 | 77.182 | 75.279 | 67.8 |
| Denmark | 78.274 | 74.822 | 70.862 | 70.259 | 67.705 | 50.0 |
| Estonia | 20.575 | 18.878 | 19.560 | 17.199 | 14.490 | 60.9 |
| Finland | 48.800 | 46.989 | 43.033 | 42.627 | 42.183 | 32.7 |
| France | 49.836 | 48.677 | 49.012 | 48.544 | 46.226 | 46.5 |
| Germany | 79.560 | 80.370 | 80.625 | 81.088 | 79.711 | 77.6 |
| Greece | 90.386 | 90.853 | 90.148 | 88.001 | 86.049 | 79.1 |
| Hungary | 74.272 | 73.294 | 71.786 | 69.550 | 68.192 | 64.2 |
| Iceland | 11.520 | 10.255 | 10.331 | 10.404 | 10.928 | 10.3 |
| (Republic of Ireland) Ireland | 90.003 | 88.322 | 86.856 | 86.278 | 84.438 | 82.4 |
| Italy | 84.629 | 84.465 | 82.201 | 79.964 | 78.586 | 76.8 |
| Latvia | 65.850 | 62.894 | 58.042 | 58.924 | 56.717 | 47.8 |
| Lithuania | 74.298 | 73.876 | 72.893 | 70.022 | 67.994 | 61.4 |
| Luxembourg | 87.957 | 87.009 | 87.216 | 84.506 | 83.332 | 70.4 |
| North Macedonia | 81.119 | 82.109 | 82.131 | 81.143 | 79.426 | 82.2 |
| Malta | 99.672 | 99.238 | 99.038 | 98.758 | 97.788 | 87.2 |
| Montenegro | 62.083 | 63.246 | 61.200 | 63.869 | 64.665 | 72.2 |
| Netherlands | 93.675 | 92.186 | 91.234 | 91.554 | 90.922 | 83.5 |
| Norway | 63.043 | 57.322 | 57.807 | 61.840 | 57.978 | 46.3 |
| Poland | 92.451 | 92.115 | 90.979 | 91.146 | 90.088 | 84.6 |
| Portugal | 75.126 | 75.657 | 75.812 | 73.350 | 72.813 | 63.1 |
| Romania | 75.071 | 77.652 | 76.427 | 73.494 | 72.524 | 70.4 |
| Russia | 90.530 | 90.908 | 90.866 | 89.512 | 92.143 | 89.5 |
| Serbia | 86.942 | 89.074 | 87.089 | 88.486 | 83.871 | 83.0 |
| Slovakia | 67.5 | 66 | | 63.8 | 62.5 | 59.5 |
| Slovenia | 66.679 | 64.935 | 65.082 | 63.749 | 59.663 | 57.8 |
| Spain | 76.001 | 76.500 | 75.008 | 72.551 | 71.531 | 68.5 |
| Sweden | 34.423 | 34.214 | 30.999 | 30.016 | 29.775 | 24.9 |
| Switzerland | 51.554 | 50.389 | 50.917 | 52.106 | 48.742 | 44.5 |
| Turkey | 89.124 | 89.969 | 89.411 | 88.157 | 89.544 | 81.3 |
| Ukraine | 80.454 | 79.554 | 79.258 | 78.232 | 75.350 | 65.5 |
| United Kingdom | 88.168 | 85.563 | 85.140 | 83.560 | 82.717 | 75.5 |

== See also ==
=== Plotted maps ===
- European countries by electricity consumption per person
- European countries by employment in agriculture (% of employed)
- European countries by health expense per person
- European countries by military expenditure as a percentage of government expenditure
- European countries by percent of population aged 0-14
- European countries by percentage of urban population
- European countries by percentage of women in national parliaments
- List of sovereign states in Europe by life expectancy
- List of sovereign states in Europe by number of Internet users
