= List of European countries by percentage of women in national parliaments =

List nations by percentage of women in their parliaments

This is a list of European countries by percentage of women in national parliaments.

As of 2024, the top three are Finland (46%), Iceland (46%) and Sweden (45%), whereas the bottom three are Cyprus (14%), Hungary (16%), Russia (16%).

== Map ==
The map data is for the year 2017 from the World Bank. Numbers are as a percentage, and are based on the proportion of women who hold national seats.

== Table ==
The table data is for an interval of years from the World Bank. Numbers are as a percentage, and are based on the proportion of women who hold national seats.

Country	2010	2011	2012	2013	2014	2015	2016	2017	2024	2025
Albania	16	16	16	18	20			28	36	35
Austria	28	28	28	33	32			31	36	36
Belarus	32	32	27	27	27			35	34	34
Belgium	39	38	38	38	39			38	41	41
Bosnia and Herzegovina	17	21	21	21	21			21	19	19
Bulgaria	21	21	23	25	20			24	21	25
Croatia	24	24	24	24	24			19	33	33
Cyprus	13	11	11	11	13			18	14	14
Czech Republic	22	22	22	20	20			20	26	34
Denmark	38	39	39	39	39			37	45	44
Estonia	23	20	21	21	19			27	30	29
Finland	40	43	43	43	43			42	46	46
France	19	19	27	27	26			39	36	36
Germany	33	33	33	37	37			37	35	32
Greece	17	19	21	21	21			18	23	23
Hungary	9	9	9	9	10			10	15	16
Iceland	43	40	40	40	40			48	46	46
(Republic of Ireland) Ireland	14	15	15	16	16			22	25	25
Italy	21	22	21	31	31			31	32	33
Latvia	20	23	23	23	18			16	32	31
Lithuania	19	19	25	24	24			21	28	28
Luxembourg	20	25	22	23	28			28	33	35
North Macedonia	33	31	33	34	33			34	39	39
Malta	9	9	9	14	14			12	28	29
Montenegro	11	12	17	16	17			24	27	27
Netherlands	41	41	39	39	39			36	39	43
Norway	40	40	40	40	40			40	44	40
Poland	20	24	24	24	24			28	30	31
Portugal	27	29	29	29	31			35	33	36
Romania	11	11	13	13	14			21	19	22
Russia	14	14	14	14	14			16	16	16
Serbia	22	22	33	33	34			34	38	37
Slovakia	25	23	20	18	22			20	23	23
Spain	37	36	36	36	40			39	44	44
Sweden	45	45	45	45	45			44	47	45
Switzerland	29	29	29	29	31			33	39	39
Turkey	9	14	14	14	14	15		15	20	20
Ukraine	8	8	9	9	12			12	21	21
United Kingdom	22	22	23	23	23			32	40	40

== See also ==
=== Plotted maps ===
- European countries by electricity consumption per person
- European countries by employment in agriculture (% of employed)
- European countries by fossil fuel use (% of total energy)
- European countries by health expense per person
- European countries by military expenditure as a percentage of government expenditure
- European countries by percent of population aged 0-14
- European countries by percentage of urban population
- List of sovereign states in Europe by life expectancy
- List of sovereign states in Europe by number of Internet users
