= European countries by military expenditure as a percentage of government expenditure =

There is a wide range in military spending throughout the European continent. In general, spending is low, with an average of around 3% of government spending, in comparison with an average of about 6.4% globally. In 2020, Russia and Belarus spent more on the military than any other European countries. However, this data precedes the Russian invasion of Ukraine, which caused military spending in Ukraine to skyrocket.

== Map ==
The map data is for year 2020 from the World Bank. Numbers are in percentage.

== See also ==
=== Plotted maps ===
- European countries by electricity consumption per person
- European countries by employment in agriculture (% of employed)
- European countries by fossil fuel use (% of total energy)
- European countries by health expense per person
- European countries by percent of population aged 0-14
- European countries by percentage of urban population
- European countries by percentage of women in national parliaments
- List of sovereign states in Europe by life expectancy
- List of sovereign states in Europe by number of Internet users
