= European countries by electricity consumption per person =

This is a list of European countries by electricity consumption per person. As of 2022, the top three are Iceland (52,920 kWh/year), Norway (23,374 kWh/year), and Finland (14,747 kWh/year), whereas the bottom three are Moldova (2,201 kWh/year), Albania (2,509 kWh/year), and Ukraine (2,636 kWh/year).

All figures in this article are given in kWh/year.

== Map ==
The map data is for year 2023 from the World Bank.

== Table ==
The most recent data used in the table is 2023 from the World Bank.

Country	2010	2011	2012	2014	2023
Albania	1,947	2,195	2,118	2,309	2,507
Austria	8,347	8,390	8,507	8,356	7,772
Belarus	3,564	3,629	3,698	3,690	3,903
Belgium	8,369	8,021	7,987	7,709	6,757
Bosnia and Herzegovina	3,155	3,343	3,479	3,601	3,772
Bulgaria	4,560	4,864	4,762	4,709	5,388
Croatia	3,814	3,901	3,819	3,714	4,476
Cyprus	4,623	4,271	4,057	3,549	3,849
Czech Republic	6,348	6,299	6,305	6,259	5,988
Denmark	6,328	6,168	6,039	5,849	5,929
Estonia	6,506	6,314	6,689	6,732	5,749
Finland	16,483	15,707	15,687	15,250	14,352
France	7,736	7,217	7,344	6,940	6,457
Germany	7,264	7,146	7,270	7,035	6,045
Greece	5,318	5,380	5,511	5,036	4,534
Hungary	3,876	3,895	3,919	3,966	4,602
Iceland	51,440	52,374	53,203	53,832	50,083
(Republic of Ireland) Ireland	5,911	5,661	5,665	5,672	6,058
Italy	5,494	5,515	5,398	5,002	5,050
Kazakhstan	4,728	4,893	5,181	5,600	5,272
Kosovo				2,818	2,818
Latvia	3,230	3,265	3,588	3,507	3,629
Lithuania	3,471	3,530	3,608	3,821	4,203
Luxembourg	16,830	15,586	14,696	13,915	11,168
North Macedonia	3,521	3,825	3,626	3,514	3,479
Malta	4,171	4,689	4,761	4,925	5,170
Moldova					2,256
Montenegro	5,420	5,752	5,416	4,612	4,391
Netherlands	7,010	7,036	6,871	6,713	6,198
Norway	24,891	23,510	23,658	23,000	23,520
Poland	3,797	3,880	3,899	3,972	4,356
Portugal	4,959	4,848	4,736	4,663	5,143
Romania	2,551	2,639	2,604	2,584	2,718
Russia	6,410	6,486	6,617	6,603	7,184
Serbia	4,359	4,490	4,387	4,272	5,114
Slovakia				5,137	4,577
Slovenia	6,521	6,806	6,778	6,728	6,470
Spain	5,707	5,599	5,573	5,356	5,111
Sweden	14,934	14,030	14,290	13,480	12,122
Switzerland	8,175	7,928	7,886	7,520	7,096
Turkey	2,498	2,709	2,794	2,815	3,523
Ukraine	3,550	3,662	3,641	3,419	2,440
United Kingdom	5,701	5,473	5,452	5,130	4,144

== See also ==
- European countries by employment in agriculture (% of employed)
- European countries by fossil fuel use (% of total energy)
- European countries by health expense per person
- European countries by military expenditure as a percentage of government expenditure
- European countries by percent of population aged 0-14
- European countries by percentage of urban population
- European countries by percentage of women in national parliaments
- List of sovereign states in Europe by life expectancy
- List of sovereign states in Europe by number of Internet users
