= List of European countries by life expectancy =

This is a list of European countries by life expectancy.

== United Nations (2023) ==
Estimation of the analytical agency of the UN.

=== UN: Estimate of life expectancy for various ages in 2023 ===
Countries and territories	Life expectancy for population in general							Life expectancy for male				Life expectancy for female				Sex gap				Population (thous.)	
Countries and territories	at birth	bonus 0→15	at 15	bonus 15→65	at 65	bonus 65→80	at 80	at birth	at 15	at 65	at 80	at birth	at 15	at 65	at 80	at birth	at 15	at 65	at 80	Population (thous.)	
Monaco	86.37	0.45	71.82	1.40	23.21	3.09	11.30	84.45	69.90	21.56	10.14	88.50	73.95	25.05	12.50	4.06	4.05	3.49	2.36	39	(Monaco)
San Marino	85.71	0.15	70.86	1.78	22.64	2.88	10.52	84.21	69.36	21.25	9.52	87.10	72.24	23.90	11.31	2.89	2.88	2.65	1.79	34	(San Marino)
Andorra	84.04	0.58	69.62	1.85	21.47	3.72	10.19	82.10	67.68	19.81	9.03	86.11	71.70	23.18	11.16	4.01	4.02	3.36	2.13	81	(Andorra)
Switzerland	83.95	0.36	69.31	2.20	21.51	3.46	9.97	82.01	67.38	20.05	9.08	85.83	71.17	22.83	10.63	3.82	3.80	2.78	1.54	8871	(Switzerland)
Italy	83.72	0.26	68.98	2.33	21.31	3.46	9.77	81.57	66.84	19.67	8.77	85.75	70.99	22.76	10.50	4.18	4.15	3.09	1.73	59499	(Italy)
Spain	83.67	0.29	68.96	2.58	21.54	3.57	10.11	80.96	66.26	19.48	8.96	86.31	71.58	23.40	10.94	5.35	5.32	3.92	1.98	47912	(Spain)
Liechtenstein	83.63	0.62	69.25	1.92	21.17	3.81	9.98	81.84	67.43	19.62	8.91	85.32	70.97	22.58	10.75	3.48	3.54	2.96	1.84	40	(Liechtenstein)
Gibraltar	83.55	1.05	69.60	2.66	22.26	3.70	10.96	80.92	67.08	20.40	9.61	86.14	72.05	23.95	11.93	5.23	4.97	3.56	2.31	38	(Gibraltar)
France	83.33	0.39	68.72	3.31	22.03	3.58	10.61	80.43	65.85	20.00	9.41	86.09	71.44	23.78	11.45	5.66	5.59	3.78	2.04	66439	(France)
Norway	83.31	0.25	68.56	2.19	20.75	3.53	9.28	81.75	67.02	19.58	8.37	84.85	70.07	21.84	10.02	3.10	3.05	2.27	1.65	5519	(Norway)
Malta	83.30	0.78	69.08	2.35	21.42	3.98	10.41	81.27	66.86	19.36	8.83	85.26	71.26	23.35	11.61	3.99	4.40	3.98	2.79	533	(Malta)
Guernsey	83.27	0.64	68.91	2.00	20.91	3.91	9.82	81.01	66.65	19.03	8.55	85.58	71.20	22.77	10.88	4.56	4.55	3.75	2.33	64	(Guernsey)
Sweden	83.26	0.24	68.50	2.42	20.92	3.71	9.63	81.44	66.69	19.55	8.69	85.10	70.33	22.23	10.40	3.66	3.64	2.69	1.71	10551	(Sweden)
Holy See	82.98	0.66	68.64	2.08	20.73	3.98	9.71	80.78	66.43	18.86	8.45	85.12	70.78	22.43	10.64	4.34	4.35	3.58	2.20	<0.5	(Holy See)
Iceland	82.69	0.16	67.85	2.92	20.77	3.52	9.29	80.98	66.22	19.82	8.72	84.51	69.57	21.73	9.80	3.52	3.35	1.91	1.08	388	(Iceland)
Ireland	82.41	0.31	67.72	2.77	20.49	3.91	9.41	80.37	65.71	19.06	8.45	84.48	69.76	21.88	10.20	4.11	4.04	2.82	1.76	5197	(Republic of Ireland)
Portugal	82.36	0.32	67.68	3.20	20.88	3.73	9.61	79.44	64.77	18.97	8.63	85.12	70.41	22.52	10.29	5.68	5.64	3.55	1.66	10431	(Portugal)
Luxembourg	82.23	0.81	68.03	2.93	20.96	3.67	9.63	80.57	66.17	19.39	8.65	83.84	69.86	22.39	10.33	3.27	3.68	3.00	1.68	665	(Luxembourg)
Netherlands	82.16	0.37	67.53	2.58	20.11	3.83	8.94	80.54	65.93	18.82	8.05	83.74	69.08	21.30	9.64	3.20	3.15	2.48	1.59	18093	(Netherlands)
Belgium	82.11	0.37	67.48	3.01	20.50	4.15	9.65	79.86	65.25	18.83	8.66	84.33	69.67	22.01	10.37	4.47	4.41	3.19	1.71	11713	(Belgium)
Austria	81.96	0.34	67.29	2.83	20.12	4.17	9.29	79.54	64.91	18.45	8.34	84.32	69.62	21.61	9.98	4.78	4.71	3.16	1.64	9130	(Austria)
Denmark	81.93	0.33	67.26	2.59	19.85	4.20	9.06	80.02	65.36	18.39	8.13	83.86	69.17	21.25	9.80	3.84	3.80	2.85	1.68	5948	(Denmark)
Finland	81.91	0.28	67.19	3.13	20.32	3.92	9.24	79.17	64.45	18.36	8.07	84.67	69.93	22.11	10.09	5.50	5.48	3.75	2.02	5601	(Finland)
Greece	81.86	0.35	67.20	2.71	19.92	4.62	9.53	79.29	64.65	18.24	8.64	84.33	69.66	21.41	10.19	5.04	5.00	3.16	1.55	10243	(Greece)
Cyprus	81.65	0.33	66.97	2.16	19.14	4.48	8.62	79.64	64.98	17.64	7.76	83.67	68.97	20.57	9.28	4.03	3.99	2.93	1.51	1345	(Cyprus)
Slovenia	81.60	0.24	66.85	2.93	19.78	4.43	9.21	78.90	64.17	17.87	8.18	84.34	69.54	21.47	9.86	5.44	5.37	3.59	1.67	2118	(Slovenia)
Germany	81.38	0.34	66.72	3.10	19.82	4.24	9.06	79.02	64.38	18.18	8.24	83.76	69.07	21.33	9.66	4.74	4.69	3.16	1.42	84548	(Germany)
United Kingdom	81.30	0.40	66.70	3.50	20.19	4.11	9.30	79.36	64.79	18.95	8.58	83.21	68.57	21.34	9.88	3.85	3.78	2.40	1.30	68683	(United Kingdom)
Isle of Man	81.00	1.31	67.31	3.25	20.56	4.21	9.78	78.93	65.29	19.16	8.84	83.13	69.38	21.93	10.55	4.21	4.08	2.77	1.71	84	(Isle of Man)
Faroe Islands	80.18	0.68	65.86	2.40	18.26	4.65	7.91	78.17	63.96	16.83	7.12	82.50	68.06	19.86	8.64	4.33	4.10	3.03	1.52	55	(Faroe Islands)
Czech Republic	79.83	0.28	65.11	3.54	18.66	4.81	8.47	77.00	62.29	16.71	7.56	82.64	67.90	20.32	9.03	5.64	5.60	3.61	1.47	10810	(Czech Republic)
Jersey	79.71	0.91	65.61	2.81	18.43	4.81	8.23	77.72	63.60	16.80	7.25	81.76	67.69	20.04	9.06	4.04	4.09	3.24	1.81	104	(Jersey)
Albania	79.60	0.89	65.49	3.27	18.76	4.48	8.24	77.73	63.64	17.87	7.76	81.45	67.31	19.61	8.67	3.72	3.67	1.74	0.91	2812	(Albania)
Estonia	79.15	0.26	64.41	4.39	18.80	5.21	9.02	74.90	60.21	15.85	7.77	83.04	68.23	20.90	9.55	8.14	8.03	5.05	1.78	1367	(Estonia)
Europe	79.06	0.40	64.45	4.91	19.36	4.87	9.23	75.53	60.94	17.48	8.33	82.56	67.93	20.90	9.79	7.04	6.99	3.41	1.46	745603	
Poland	78.63	0.35	63.98	4.71	18.70	5.36	9.06	74.88	60.23	16.43	8.05	82.35	67.70	20.52	9.60	7.48	7.47	4.09	1.55	38763	(Poland)
Croatia	78.58	0.37	63.95	3.63	17.58	5.10	7.68	75.41	60.78	15.45	6.46	81.69	67.05	19.39	8.42	6.28	6.27	3.94	1.96	3896	(Croatia)
Slovakia	78.34	0.51	63.85	4.31	18.16	5.27	8.43	75.02	60.56	16.06	7.70	81.58	67.06	19.83	8.81	6.56	6.50	3.77	1.11	5518	(Slovakia)
Kosovo	78.03	0.78	63.81	3.13	16.94	5.38	7.32	75.80	61.62	15.45	6.61	80.12	65.85	18.24	7.82	4.31	4.22	2.79	1.22	1700	
Bosnia and Herzegovina	77.85	0.48	63.33	4.05	17.38	5.91	8.29	74.42	59.93	14.83	6.32	80.90	66.35	19.27	9.27	6.48	6.42	4.44	2.95	3185	(Bosnia and Herzegovina)
North Macedonia	77.39	0.53	62.92	3.58	16.50	5.68	7.18	75.11	60.67	15.01	6.26	79.57	65.05	17.74	7.75	4.46	4.38	2.74	1.49	1832	(North Macedonia)
Turkey	77.16	1.36	63.52	4.06	17.58	5.18	7.75	74.53	60.85	15.57	6.41	79.86	66.26	19.46	8.78	5.33	5.40	3.89	2.37	87271	(Turkey)
Montenegro	77.09	0.40	62.48	4.33	16.82	5.75	7.57	73.73	59.16	14.54	6.08	80.31	65.67	18.71	8.45	6.58	6.52	4.17	2.37	634	(Montenegro)
Hungary	77.02	0.37	62.40	4.76	17.16	5.84	8.00	73.71	59.11	15.04	7.26	80.19	65.52	18.78	8.37	6.48	6.41	3.74	1.10	9686	(Hungary)
Serbia	76.77	0.44	62.21	4.52	16.73	6.30	8.03	73.50	58.96	14.51	6.59	80.04	65.45	18.71	9.06	6.54	6.49	4.20	2.46	6773	(Serbia)
Latvia	76.19	0.35	61.54	5.95	17.49	5.78	8.27	71.56	56.87	14.55	7.13	80.47	65.86	19.50	8.74	8.91	8.98	4.95	1.61	1882	(Latvia)
Lithuania	76.03	0.33	61.35	6.03	17.38	5.83	8.21	71.22	56.57	14.38	7.09	80.67	65.96	19.48	8.70	9.46	9.40	5.10	1.61	2854	(Lithuania)
Romania	75.94	0.54	61.48	5.38	16.86	5.68	7.55	72.40	57.96	14.97	7.14	79.56	65.07	18.39	7.79	7.16	7.11	3.42	0.64	19118	(Romania)
Armenia	75.68	0.84	61.53	4.66	16.19	5.93	7.12	71.39	57.25	13.86	6.16	79.45	65.26	17.84	7.61	8.07	8.01	3.97	1.45	2943	(Armenia)
Bulgaria	75.64	0.53	61.16	5.38	16.54	5.82	7.36	72.16	57.68	14.47	6.73	79.21	64.74	18.25	7.72	7.05	7.06	3.78	0.99	6796	(Bulgaria)
Georgia	74.50	0.81	60.31	5.85	16.16	6.17	7.32	69.57	55.42	13.38	5.39	79.11	64.86	18.16	8.30	9.54	9.44	4.78	2.91	3807	(Georgia (country))
Belarus	74.43	0.25	59.69	6.50	16.19	5.94	7.13	69.53	54.80	13.43	6.22	79.06	64.30	18.01	7.46	9.53	9.49	4.58	1.24	9116	(Belarus)
Azerbaijan	74.43	1.50	60.93	4.44	15.38	6.19	6.57	71.56	58.15	13.80	5.90	77.13	63.53	16.63	6.95	5.57	5.38	2.83	1.05	10318	(Azerbaijan)
Ukraine	73.42	0.62	59.04	8.83	17.87	7.01	9.88	66.90	52.52	14.74	8.37	80.20	65.81	19.91	10.48	13.30	13.29	5.17	2.11	37733	(Ukraine)
World	73.17	3.29	61.46	6.11	17.57	5.75	8.31	70.55	58.91	16.01	7.43	75.89	64.09	18.98	8.96	5.34	5.18	2.97	1.53	8091735	
Russia	73.15	0.43	58.59	8.54	17.12	6.46	8.58	67.26	52.70	14.37	7.54	79.04	64.44	18.88	8.98	11.78	11.74	4.51	1.44	145440	(Russia)
Moldova	71.20	1.12	57.32	7.38	14.70	7.25	6.95	66.57	52.73	12.26	5.39	75.53	61.59	16.35	7.61	8.97	8.86	4.09	2.22	3067	(Moldova)

=== UN: Change of life expectancy from 2019 to 2023 ===
Countries and territories	2023				Historical data									Recovery from COVID-19: 2019→2023	Population (thous.)	
Countries and territories	All	Male	Female	Sex gap	2019	2019 →2020	2020	2020 →2021	2021	2021 →2022	2022	2022 →2023	2023	Recovery from COVID-19: 2019→2023	Population (thous.)	
Monaco	86.37	84.45	88.50	4.06	86.15	−0.06	86.09	−0.98	85.11	0.63	85.75	0.63	86.37	0.22	39	(Monaco)
San Marino	85.71	84.21	87.10	2.89	85.26	−2.61	82.65	0.89	83.54	2.17	85.71	0.00	85.71	0.45	34	(San Marino)
Andorra	84.04	82.10	86.11	4.01	84.10	−4.68	79.42	2.91	82.33	1.69	84.02	0.03	84.04	−0.06	81	(Andorra)
Switzerland	83.95	82.01	85.83	3.82	83.78	−0.72	83.06	0.58	83.65	−0.45	83.20	0.75	83.95	0.17	8871	(Switzerland)
Italy	83.72	81.57	85.75	4.18	83.34	−1.16	82.18	0.68	82.86	−0.81	82.05	1.66	83.72	0.37	59499	(Italy)
Spain	83.67	80.96	86.31	5.35	83.48	−1.24	82.24	0.71	82.95	−0.58	82.37	1.30	83.67	0.19	47912	(Spain)
Liechtenstein	83.63	81.84	85.32	3.48	83.41	−1.37	82.04	0.75	82.79	0.62	83.41	0.23	83.63	0.23	40	(Liechtenstein)
Gibraltar	83.55	80.92	86.14	5.23	83.18	−0.11	83.07	−2.80	80.27	3.24	83.52	0.04	83.55	0.37	38	(Gibraltar)
France	83.33	80.43	86.09	5.66	82.73	−0.53	82.20	0.12	82.32	0.15	82.47	0.85	83.33	0.59	66439	(France)
Norway	83.31	81.75	84.85	3.10	82.95	0.24	83.19	−0.03	83.17	−0.54	82.63	0.68	83.31	0.35	5519	(Norway)
Malta	83.30	81.27	85.26	3.99	82.84	−0.50	82.34	−0.02	82.32	−0.07	82.25	1.05	83.30	0.46	533	(Malta)
Guernsey	83.27	81.01	85.58	4.56	83.28	0.07	83.35	−1.38	81.97	1.14	83.11	0.17	83.27	−0.01	64	(Guernsey)
Sweden	83.26	81.44	85.10	3.66	83.05	−0.62	82.43	0.59	83.02	0.03	83.05	0.22	83.26	0.21	10551	(Sweden)
Holy See	82.98	80.78	85.12	4.34	83.62	−0.64	82.99	−0.04	82.95	0.39	83.33	−0.35	82.98	−0.64	<0.5	(Holy See)
Iceland	82.69	80.98	84.51	3.52	82.85	−0.14	82.71	0.13	82.84	−1.25	81.59	1.10	82.69	−0.16	388	(Iceland)
Ireland	82.41	80.37	84.48	4.11	82.41	−0.02	82.39	−0.53	81.86	0.19	82.05	0.36	82.41	0.00	5197	(Republic of Ireland)
Portugal	82.36	79.44	85.12	5.68	81.96	−0.59	81.37	0.03	81.40	−0.20	81.19	1.17	82.36	0.40	10431	(Portugal)
Luxembourg	82.23	80.57	83.84	3.27	81.59	−0.18	81.41	0.43	81.84	0.36	82.20	0.03	82.23	0.64	665	(Luxembourg)
Netherlands	82.16	80.54	83.74	3.20	82.05	−0.66	81.39	−0.04	81.36	0.56	81.91	0.25	82.16	0.10	18093	(Netherlands)
Belgium	82.11	79.86	84.33	4.47	81.83	−1.04	80.80	0.86	81.66	−0.50	81.16	0.96	82.11	0.28	11713	(Belgium)
Austria	81.96	79.54	84.32	4.78	81.91	−0.10	81.80	0.02	81.82	−0.52	81.30	0.66	81.96	0.05	9130	(Austria)
Denmark	81.93	80.02	83.86	3.84	81.43	0.11	81.55	−0.11	81.44	−0.14	81.29	0.64	81.93	0.50	5948	(Denmark)
Finland	81.91	79.17	84.67	5.50	81.86	−0.04	81.82	−0.01	81.81	−0.57	81.24	0.67	81.91	0.05	5601	(Finland)
Greece	81.86	79.29	84.33	5.04	81.35	0.19	81.54	−1.00	80.53	−0.59	79.94	1.91	81.86	0.51	10243	(Greece)
Cyprus	81.65	79.64	83.67	4.03	81.45	−0.22	81.23	−0.66	80.57	−0.14	80.43	1.21	81.65	0.19	1345	(Cyprus)
Slovenia	81.60	78.90	84.34	5.44	81.01	−0.64	80.36	0.07	80.43	0.36	80.79	0.81	81.60	0.60	2118	(Slovenia)
Germany	81.38	79.02	83.76	4.74	81.19	−0.18	81.00	0.10	81.11	−0.53	80.58	0.80	81.38	0.19	84548	(Germany)
United Kingdom	81.30	79.36	83.21	3.85	81.44	−1.06	80.39	0.32	80.71	0.37	81.07	0.23	81.30	−0.14	68683	(United Kingdom)
Isle of Man	81.00	78.93	83.13	4.21	80.74	−0.15	80.59	−0.17	80.42	0.54	80.96	0.04	81.00	0.26	84	(Isle of Man)
Faroe Islands	80.18	78.17	82.50	4.33	79.91	0.08	79.98	−0.19	79.79	−0.53	79.26	0.92	80.18	0.27	55	(Faroe Islands)
Czech Republic	79.83	77.00	82.64	5.64	79.19	−0.95	78.24	−1.00	77.23	1.93	79.17	0.67	79.83	0.65	10810	(Czech Republic)
Jersey	79.71	77.72	81.76	4.04	79.89	−0.45	79.45	−0.12	79.32	0.40	79.73	−0.02	79.71	−0.19	104	(Jersey)
Albania	79.60	77.73	81.45	3.72	79.47	−1.64	77.82	−0.98	76.84	1.93	78.77	0.83	79.60	0.14	2812	(Albania)
Estonia	79.15	74.90	83.04	8.14	78.77	0.12	78.89	−1.48	77.41	0.76	78.17	0.99	79.15	0.38	1367	(Estonia)
Europe	79.06	75.53	82.56	7.04	78.76	−1.11	77.65	−0.61	77.04	1.15	78.18	0.88	79.06	0.30	745603	
Poland	78.63	74.88	82.35	7.48	77.92	−1.33	76.59	−0.96	75.64	2.28	77.92	0.71	78.63	0.71	38763	(Poland)
Croatia	78.58	75.41	81.69	6.28	78.20	−0.70	77.50	−0.36	77.14	1.14	78.28	0.30	78.58	0.38	3896	(Croatia)
Slovakia	78.34	75.02	81.58	6.56	77.69	−0.82	76.86	−2.27	74.59	2.45	77.04	1.30	78.34	0.66	5518	(Slovakia)
Kosovo	78.03	75.80	80.12	4.31	77.25	−3.04	74.21	0.77	74.98	2.64	77.62	0.41	78.03	0.78	1700	
Bosnia and Herzegovina	77.85	74.42	80.90	6.48	77.39	−1.35	76.04	−1.47	74.57	2.21	76.78	1.07	77.85	0.46	3185	(Bosnia and Herzegovina)
North Macedonia	77.39	75.11	79.57	4.46	76.83	−2.37	74.47	−1.18	73.29	3.35	76.64	0.75	77.39	0.56	1832	(North Macedonia)
Turkey	77.16	74.53	79.86	5.33	77.74	−1.21	76.53	−0.80	75.72	1.87	77.59	−0.43	77.16	−0.58	87271	(Turkey)
Montenegro	77.09	73.73	80.31	6.58	76.64	−0.79	75.85	−2.06	73.79	2.13	75.92	1.17	77.09	0.45	634	(Montenegro)
Hungary	77.02	73.71	80.19	6.48	76.45	−0.72	75.73	−1.54	74.19	2.03	76.21	0.81	77.02	0.57	9686	(Hungary)
Serbia	76.77	73.50	80.04	6.54	76.06	−1.55	74.51	−1.65	72.85	2.62	75.48	1.29	76.77	0.71	6773	(Serbia)
Latvia	76.19	71.56	80.47	8.91	75.63	−0.15	75.48	−2.30	73.18	1.69	74.87	1.32	76.19	0.56	1882	(Latvia)
Lithuania	76.03	71.22	80.67	9.46	76.42	−1.32	75.11	−0.81	74.30	0.40	74.70	1.33	76.03	−0.40	2854	(Lithuania)
Romania	75.94	72.40	79.56	7.16	75.33	−1.28	74.05	−1.31	72.74	2.52	75.26	0.68	75.94	0.61	19118	(Romania)
Armenia	75.68	71.39	79.45	8.07	75.19	−6.30	68.89	3.66	72.55	2.08	74.63	1.05	75.68	0.49	2943	(Armenia)
Bulgaria	75.64	72.16	79.21	7.05	75.09	−1.49	73.60	−2.19	71.41	2.62	74.03	1.60	75.64	0.55	6796	(Bulgaria)
Georgia	74.50	69.57	79.11	9.54	74.17	−0.66	73.51	−1.87	71.64	2.51	74.14	0.35	74.50	0.33	3807	(Georgia (country))
Belarus	74.43	69.53	79.06	9.53	74.25	−1.99	72.27	−0.05	72.22	2.14	74.36	0.07	74.43	0.18	9116	(Belarus)
Azerbaijan	74.43	71.56	77.13	5.57	73.29	−2.98	70.31	0.69	71.00	3.13	74.12	0.30	74.43	1.14	10318	(Azerbaijan)
Ukraine	73.42	66.90	80.20	13.30	73.92	−0.64	73.28	−1.65	71.63	1.03	72.66	0.76	73.42	−0.50	37733	(Ukraine)
World	73.17	70.55	75.89	5.34	72.61	−0.69	71.92	−1.05	70.86	1.77	72.64	0.53	73.17	0.56	8091735	
Russia	73.15	67.26	79.04	11.78	73.07	−1.90	71.17	−1.36	69.81	2.71	72.52	0.64	73.15	0.09	145440	(Russia)
Moldova	71.20	66.57	75.53	8.97	70.18	−0.27	69.91	−0.92	68.99	2.56	71.55	−0.35	71.20	1.02	3067	(Moldova)

Placement on the map of UN data for some European countries for 2023:

== World Bank Group (2024) ==
Estimation of the World Bank Group for 2024. The data is filtered according to the list of countries in Europe. The values in the World Bank Group tables are rounded. All calculations are based on raw data, so due to the nuances of rounding, in some places, illusory inconsistencies of indicators arose, with a size of 0.01 year.

World Bank Group (2024)
Countries and territories	2024				Historical data													recovery from COVID-19: 2019→2024	
Countries and territories	All	Male	Female	Sex gap	2014	2014 →2019	2019	2019 →2020	2020	2020 →2021	2021	2021 →2022	2022	2022 →2023	2023	2023 →2024	2024	recovery from COVID-19: 2019→2024	
Monaco	86.50	84.56	88.63	4.07	85.09	1.06	86.15	−0.06	86.09	−0.98	85.11	0.63	85.75	0.63	86.37	0.12	86.50	0.35	(Monaco)
San Marino	85.82	84.32	87.22	2.90	84.39	0.86	85.26	−2.61	82.65	0.89	83.54	2.17	85.71	0.00	85.71	0.11	85.82	0.56	(San Marino)
Switzerland	84.41	82.70	86.20	3.50	83.20	0.71	83.90	−0.90	83.00	0.75	83.75	−0.15	83.60	0.55	84.16	0.25	84.41	0.50	(Switzerland)
Liechtenstein	84.20	82.20	86.30	4.10	82.07	2.09	84.16	−2.50	81.66	2.74	84.40	−0.28	84.12	0.47	84.60	−0.40	84.20	0.04	(Liechtenstein)
Andorra	84.19	82.26	86.24	3.98	84.48	−0.39	84.10	−4.68	79.42	2.91	82.33	1.69	84.02	0.02	84.04	0.15	84.19	0.09	(Andorra)
Sweden	84.06	82.60	85.60	3.00	82.25	0.86	83.11	−0.75	82.36	0.70	83.06	0.00	83.06	0.25	83.31	0.75	84.06	0.95	(Sweden)
Italy	83.95	82.00	86.00	4.00	83.09	0.41	83.50	−1.30	82.20	0.45	82.65	0.05	82.70	0.65	83.35	0.60	83.95	0.45	(Italy)
Spain	83.89	81.40	86.50	5.10	83.23	0.60	83.83	−1.60	82.23	0.95	83.18	−0.04	83.13	0.80	83.93	−0.05	83.89	0.06	(Spain)
Gibraltar	83.63	81.03	86.19	5.16	82.64	0.54	83.18	−0.11	83.07	−2.80	80.27	3.24	83.52	0.04	83.55	0.08	83.63	0.45	(Gibraltar)
Luxembourg	83.20	81.00	85.50	4.50	82.23	0.41	82.64	−0.50	82.14	0.45	82.60	0.35	82.95	0.36	83.31	−0.11	83.20	0.56	(Luxembourg)
Norway	83.16	81.60	84.80	3.20	82.10	0.86	82.96	0.25	83.21	−0.05	83.16	−0.65	82.51	0.50	83.01	0.15	83.16	0.20	(Norway)
Faroe Islands	83.08	81.34	84.91	3.58	81.59	0.80	82.39	0.14	82.53	0.14	82.68	0.14	82.82	0.14	82.95	0.13	83.08	0.69	(Faroe Islands)
Ireland	83.01	81.40	84.70	3.30	81.35	1.35	82.70	−0.25	82.46	−0.20	82.25	0.26	82.51	0.30	82.81	0.20	83.01	0.31	(Republic of Ireland)
France	82.98	80.20	85.90	5.70	82.72	0.11	82.83	−0.65	82.18	0.15	82.32	−0.20	82.13	0.70	82.83	0.15	82.98	0.15	(France)
Malta	82.96	81.20	84.80	3.60	81.90	0.76	82.66	−0.56	82.10	0.16	82.26	0.04	82.30	1.06	83.36	−0.40	82.96	0.30	(Malta)
Iceland	82.81	81.20	84.50	3.30	82.86	0.30	83.16	−0.10	83.06	0.10	83.17	−1.05	82.12	0.34	82.46	0.35	82.81	−0.35	(Iceland)
Portugal	82.38	79.70	85.20	5.50	81.12	0.55	81.68	−0.35	81.33	0.05	81.38	0.25	81.63	0.70	82.33	0.05	82.38	0.71	(Portugal)
Finland	82.34	79.80	85.00	5.20	81.18	0.80	81.98	−0.05	81.93	−0.05	81.89	−0.70	81.19	0.40	81.59	0.75	82.34	0.35	(Finland)
Belgium	82.30	80.30	84.40	4.10	81.29	0.71	82.00	−1.30	80.70	1.10	81.79	−0.04	81.75	0.65	82.40	−0.10	82.30	0.30	(Belgium)
Slovenia	82.29	79.70	85.00	5.30	81.08	0.45	81.53	−1.00	80.53	0.14	80.68	0.61	81.28	0.65	81.93	0.36	82.29	0.76	(Slovenia)
Denmark	82.25	80.40	84.20	3.80	80.70	0.75	81.45	0.15	81.60	−0.20	81.40	−0.10	81.30	0.45	81.75	0.50	82.25	0.80	(Denmark)
Austria	82.00	79.80	84.30	4.50	81.49	0.40	81.90	−0.70	81.19	0.00	81.19	0.10	81.30	0.50	81.79	0.20	82.00	0.10	(Austria)
Netherlands	81.97	80.60	83.40	2.80	81.71	0.40	82.11	−0.75	81.36	−0.05	81.31	0.30	81.61	0.25	81.86	0.10	81.97	−0.15	(Netherlands)
Greece	81.84	79.40	84.40	5.00	81.39	0.25	81.64	−0.35	81.29	−1.20	80.08	0.70	80.79	0.95	81.74	0.10	81.84	0.20	(Greece)
Cyprus	81.82	79.84	83.80	3.96	81.34	0.12	81.45	−0.22	81.23	−0.66	80.57	−0.14	80.43	1.21	81.65	0.17	81.82	0.37	(Cyprus)
United Kingdom	81.39	79.54	83.33	3.78	81.30	0.06	81.37	−1.04	80.33	0.32	80.65	0.36	81.01	0.23	81.24	0.15	81.39	0.02	(United Kingdom)
Channel Islands	81.20	79.10	83.30	4.20	81.60	−0.40	81.20	−0.30	80.90	−0.60	80.30	0.70	81.00	0.10	81.10	0.10	81.20	0.00	(Channel Islands)
Isle of Man	81.09	79.04	83.20	4.16	80.20	0.54	80.74	−0.15	80.59	−0.17	80.42	0.54	80.96	0.04	81.00	0.09	81.09	0.35	(Isle of Man)
Germany	80.79	78.50	83.20	4.70	81.09	0.20	81.29	−0.25	81.04	−0.25	80.79	−0.18	80.61	0.43	81.04	−0.25	80.79	−0.50	(Germany)
Czechia	79.98	77.10	83.00	5.90	78.82	0.40	79.23	−1.00	78.23	−1.00	77.22	1.71	78.93	0.90	79.83	0.15	79.98	0.75	(Czech Republic)
Albania	79.78	77.92	81.59	3.67	78.03	1.44	79.47	−1.64	77.82	−0.98	76.84	1.93	78.77	0.83	79.60	0.17	79.78	0.31	(Albania)
Estonia	79.30	75.10	83.70	8.60	77.03	1.61	78.65	−0.05	78.60	−1.65	76.94	0.90	77.84	0.95	78.79	0.50	79.30	0.65	(Estonia)
Croatia	78.93	76.10	81.90	5.80	77.72	0.50	78.22	−0.70	77.52	−1.10	76.42	1.15	77.58	0.90	78.47	0.46	78.93	0.70	(Croatia)
Poland	78.41	74.80	82.20	7.40	77.60	0.30	77.90	−1.50	76.40	−1.05	75.35	1.80	77.16	1.10	78.26	0.15	78.41	0.50	(Poland)
Slovakia	78.37	75.20	81.70	6.50	76.81	0.85	77.67	−0.80	76.87	−2.25	74.61	2.35	76.97	1.15	78.12	0.25	78.37	0.70	(Slovakia)
Armenia	78.32	75.10	81.70	6.60	74.87	1.35	76.22	−2.85	73.38	−1.10	72.28	2.49	74.77	2.70	77.47	0.85	78.32	2.10	(Armenia)
Bosnia and Herzegovina	78.04	74.65	81.07	6.42	77.09	0.31	77.39	−1.35	76.04	−1.47	74.57	2.21	76.78	1.07	77.85	0.19	78.04	0.65	(Bosnia and Herzegovina)
Montenegro	77.89	75.50	80.40	4.90	76.34	0.34	76.68	−0.75	75.93	−2.11	73.82	2.36	76.19	1.40	77.59	0.30	77.89	1.21	(Montenegro)
Turkey	77.42	74.62	80.34	5.72	76.45	1.28	77.74	−1.21	76.53	−0.80	75.72	1.87	77.59	−0.43	77.16	0.27	77.42	−0.32	(Turkey)
Lithuania	77.20	73.00	81.60	8.60	74.52	1.77	76.28	−1.25	75.03	−0.99	74.04	1.61	75.64	1.65	77.29	−0.10	77.20	0.91	(Lithuania)
Hungary	76.72	73.70	79.90	6.20	75.76	0.56	76.32	−0.90	75.42	−1.35	74.07	1.80	75.87	0.70	76.57	0.15	76.72	0.40	(Hungary)
North Macedonia	76.62	74.48	78.86	4.38	75.45	1.15	76.60	−2.21	74.40	−1.15	73.25	1.18	74.42	0.89	75.32	1.30	76.62	0.01	(North Macedonia)
Romania	76.46	72.80	80.30	7.50	74.91	0.70	75.61	−1.35	74.25	−1.44	72.81	2.34	75.15	1.25	76.40	0.05	76.46	0.85	(Romania)
Latvia	76.43	71.60	81.50	9.90	74.12	1.26	75.39	−0.20	75.19	−2.20	72.98	1.30	74.28	1.15	75.43	1.00	76.43	1.04	(Latvia)
Serbia	75.97	73.70	78.35	4.65	75.34	0.60	75.94	−1.46	74.48	−1.70	72.78	2.46	75.24	0.90	76.14	−0.17	75.97	0.03	(Serbia)
Bulgaria	75.76	72.20	79.50	7.30	74.47	0.65	75.11	−1.76	73.36	−2.14	71.21	2.95	74.16	1.60	75.76	0.00	75.76	0.65	(Bulgaria)
Ukraine	74.69	69.79	79.39	9.61	71.80	2.12	73.92	−0.64	73.28	−1.65	71.63	1.03	72.66	0.76	73.42	1.27	74.69	0.77	(Ukraine)
Georgia	74.66	69.75	79.23	9.49	73.11	1.06	74.17	−0.66	73.51	−1.87	71.64	2.51	74.14	0.35	74.50	0.16	74.66	0.49	(Georgia (country))
Azerbaijan	74.58	71.71	77.28	5.58	71.93	1.36	73.29	−2.98	70.31	0.69	71.00	3.13	74.12	0.30	74.43	0.15	74.58	1.29	(Azerbaijan)
Kazakhstan	74.53	70.27	78.52	8.25	71.42	2.24	73.66	−2.46	71.19	−1.06	70.13	3.37	73.50	0.90	74.40	0.13	74.53	0.87	(Kazakhstan)
Belarus	74.37	69.74	79.22	9.48	72.97	1.26	74.23	−2.09	72.14	−0.07	72.07	2.03	74.10	0.08	74.18	0.18	74.37	0.14	(Belarus)
World	73.48	71.11	75.97	4.86	71.78	1.09	72.87	−0.69	72.18	−0.97	71.21	1.75	72.97	0.36	73.33	0.15	73.48	0.61	
Russia	73.44	68.26	78.88	10.62	70.74	2.34	73.08	−1.75	71.34	−1.44	69.90	2.65	72.55	0.71	73.25	0.19	73.44	0.36	(Russia)
Moldova	71.33	66.70	75.67	8.97	70.24	−0.06	70.18	−0.27	69.91	−0.92	68.99	2.56	71.55	−0.35	71.20	0.13	71.33	1.15	(Moldova)

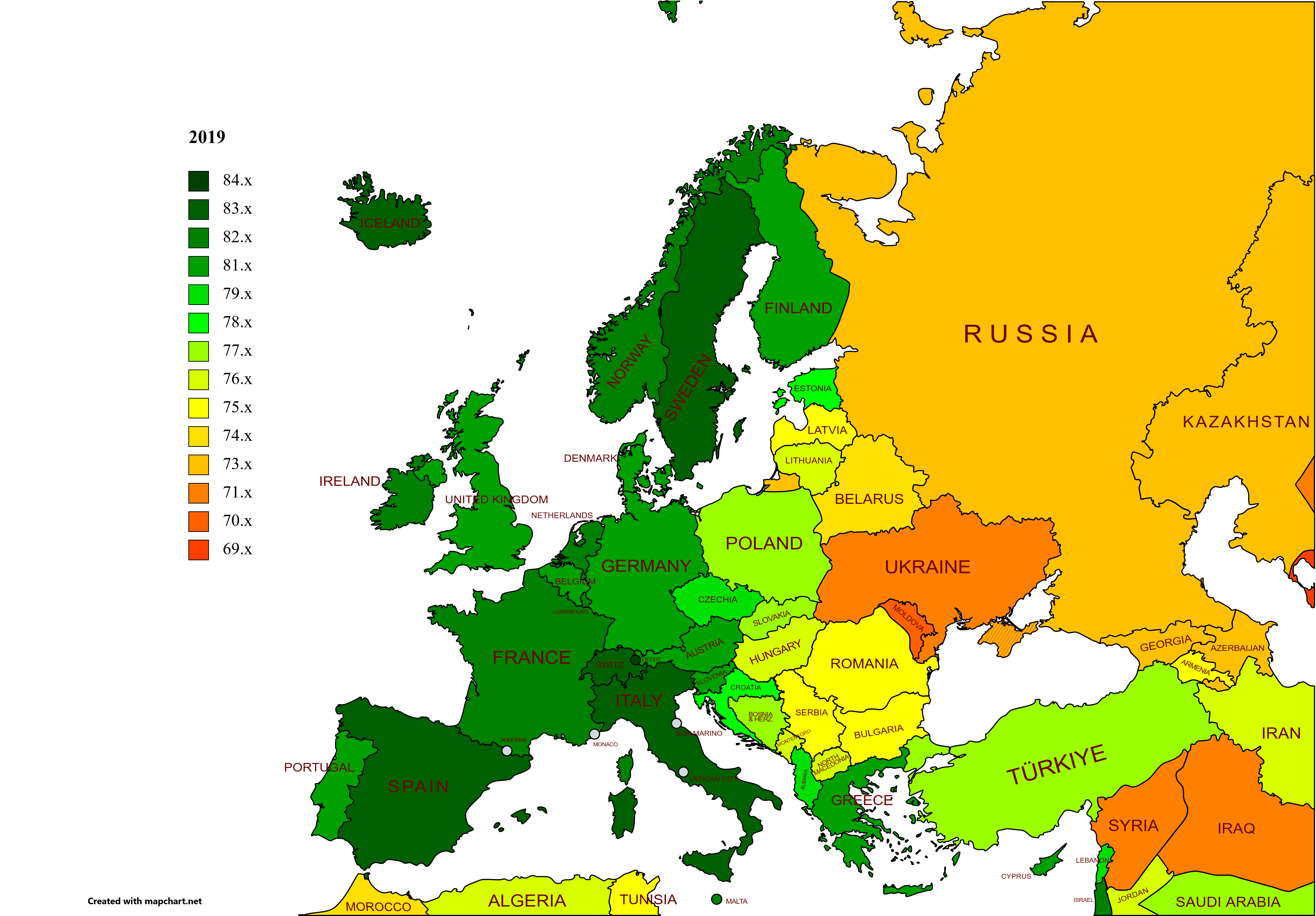
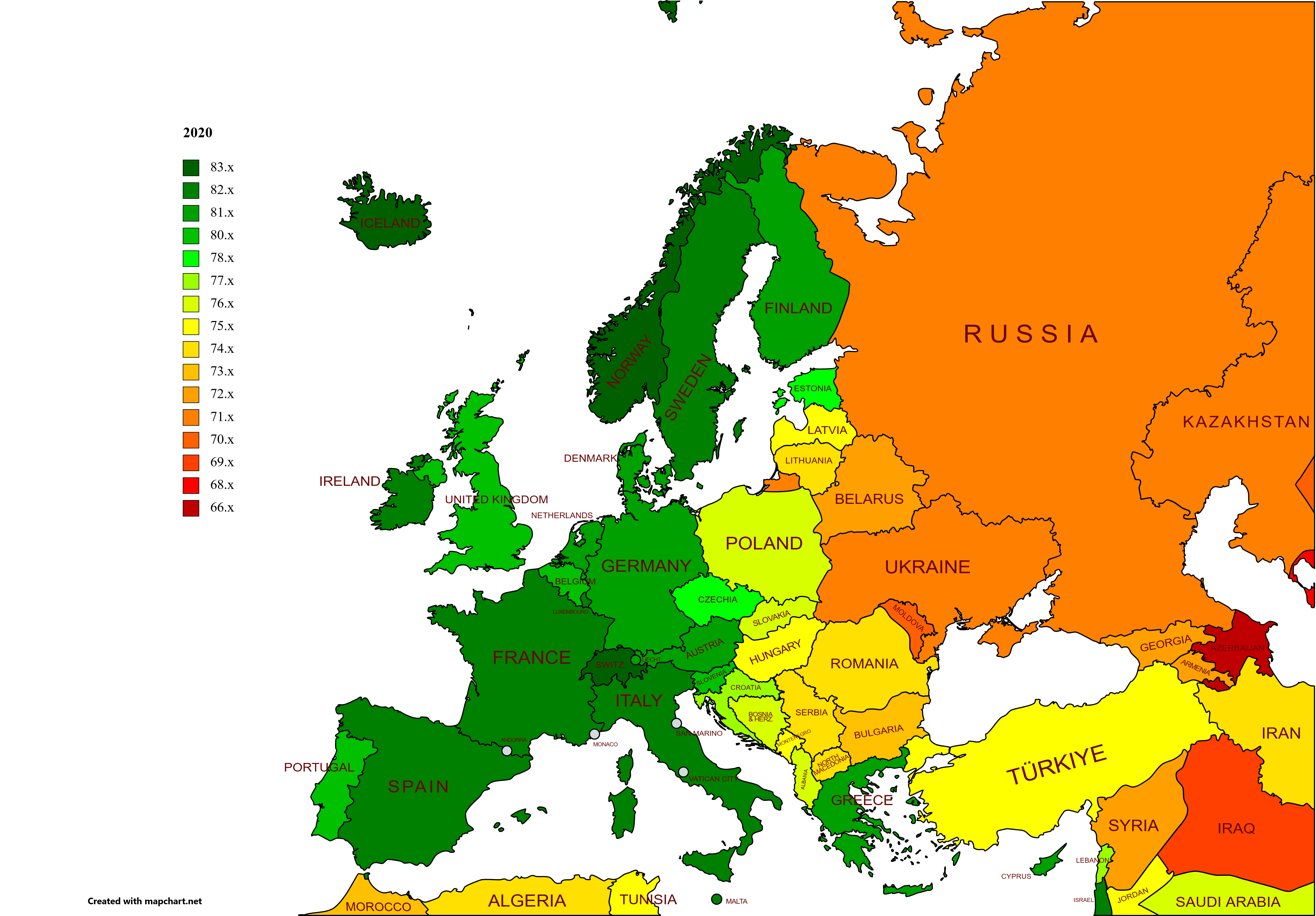
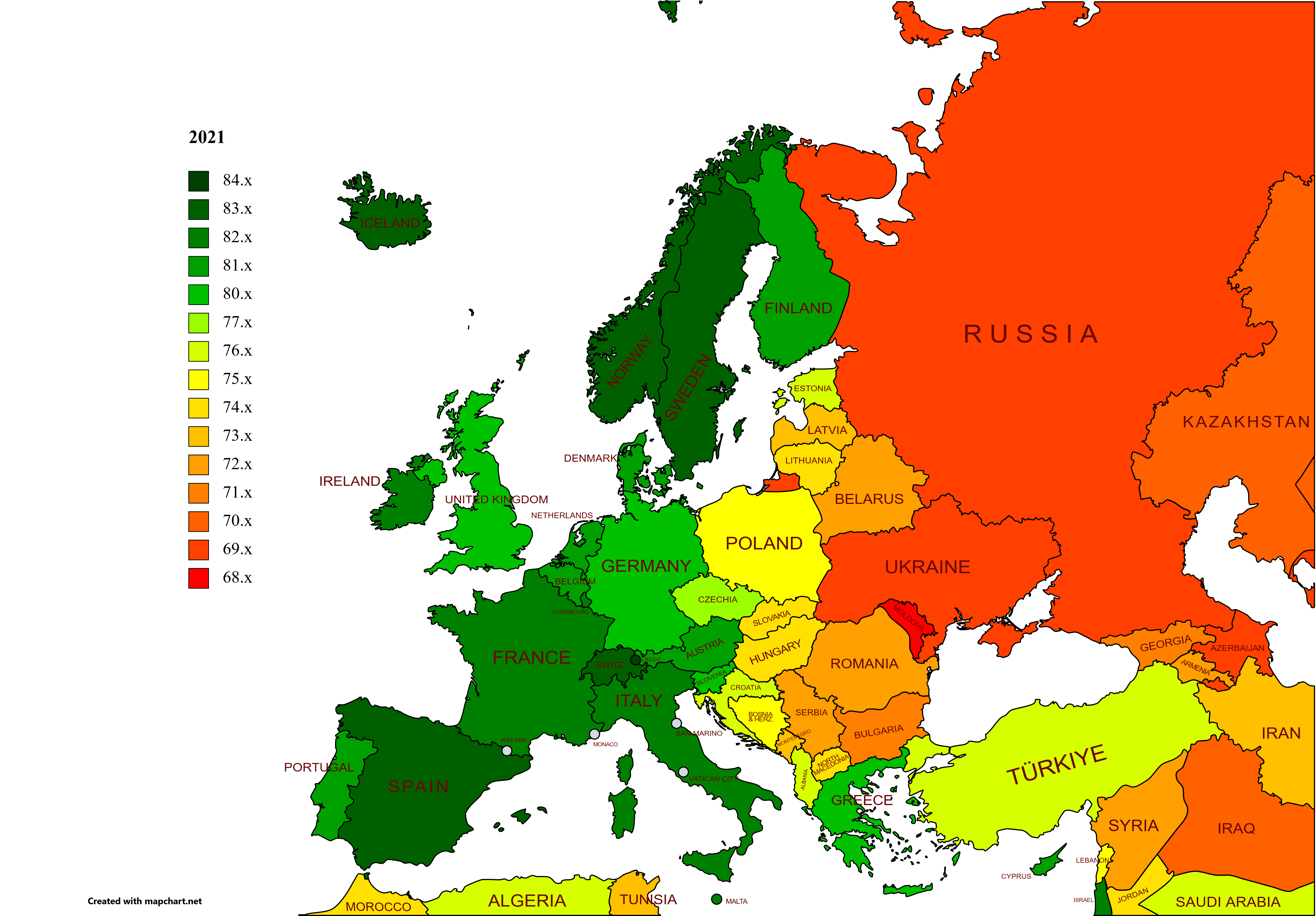
Change in life expectancy in Europe from 2019 to 2021

== Eurostat (2023) ==
Estimate of Eurostat. Data for some countries are marked at the Eurostat site as provisional or estimated. By default, the table is sorted by 2023.

country	2014				2014 →2019	2019				2019 →2023	2023				2014 →2023
country	overall	male	female	F Δ M	2014 →2019	overall	male	female	F Δ M	2019 →2023	overall	male	female	F Δ M	2014 →2023
Liechtenstein	82.1	81.0	83.2	2.2	2.2	84.3	82.6	85.8	3.2	0.3	84.6	82.4	86.9	4.5	2.5
Switzerland	83.3	81.1	85.4	4.3	0.7	84.0	82.1	85.8	3.7	0.3	84.3	82.4	86.0	3.6	1.0
Spain	83.3	80.4	86.2	5.8	0.7	84.0	81.1	86.7	5.6	0.0	84.0	81.3	86.7	5.4	0.7
Italy	83.2	80.7	85.6	4.9	0.4	83.6	81.4	85.7	4.3	−0.1	83.5	81.4	85.4	4.0	0.3
Sweden	82.3	80.4	84.2	3.8	0.9	83.2	81.5	84.8	3.3	0.2	83.4	81.7	85.0	3.3	1.1
Luxembourg	82.3	79.4	85.2	5.8	0.4	82.7	80.2	85.2	5.0	0.7	83.4	81.7	85.0	3.3	1.1
Malta	82.0	79.7	84.2	4.5	0.7	82.7	81.0	84.4	3.4	0.7	83.4	81.6	85.2	3.6	1.4
Norway	82.2	80.1	84.2	4.1	0.8	83.0	81.3	84.7	3.4	0.1	83.1	81.5	84.6	3.1	0.9
France	82.9	79.5	86.1	6.6	0.1	83.0	79.9	85.9	6.0	0.0	83.0	80.1	85.7	5.6	0.1
Ireland	81.4	79.3	83.5	4.2	1.4	82.8	80.8	84.7	3.9	0.1	82.9	81.1	84.6	3.5	1.5
Cyprus	82.3	80.3	84.3	4.0	0.0	82.3	80.3	84.4	4.1	0.6	82.9	80.9	84.9	4.0	0.6
Belgium	81.4	78.8	83.9	5.1	0.7	82.1	79.8	84.3	4.5	0.4	82.5	80.4	84.5	4.1	1.1
Portugal	81.3	78.0	84.4	6.4	0.6	81.9	78.7	84.8	6.1	0.6	82.5	79.5	85.3	5.8	1.2
Iceland	82.9	81.3	84.5	3.2	0.3	83.2	81.7	84.7	3.0	−0.8	82.4	80.7	84.3	3.6	−0.5
Slovenia	81.2	78.2	84.1	5.9	0.4	81.6	78.7	84.5	5.8	0.4	82.0	79.1	84.9	5.8	0.8
Netherlands	81.8	80.0	83.5	3.5	0.4	82.2	80.6	83.7	3.1	−0.3	81.9	80.4	83.4	3.0	0.1
Austria	81.6	79.1	84.0	4.9	0.4	82.0	79.7	84.2	4.5	−0.1	81.9	79.5	84.2	4.7	0.3
Denmark	80.7	78.7	82.8	4.1	0.8	81.5	79.5	83.5	4.0	0.3	81.8	79.9	83.7	3.8	1.1
Greece	81.5	78.8	84.1	5.3	0.2	81.7	79.2	84.2	5.0	0.1	81.8	79.2	84.4	5.2	0.3
Finland	81.3	78.4	84.1	5.7	0.8	82.1	79.3	84.8	5.5	−0.5	81.6	79.0	84.3	5.3	0.3
Germany	81.2	78.7	83.6	4.9	0.1	81.3	79.0	83.7	4.7	−0.2	81.1	78.7	83.5	4.8	−0.1
Czech Republic	78.9	75.8	82.0	6.2	0.4	79.3	76.4	82.2	5.8	0.6	79.9	76.9	82.9	6.0	1.0
Estonia	77.4	72.4	81.9	9.5	1.6	79.0	74.5	83.0	8.5	0.1	79.1	74.5	83.3	8.8	1.7
Croatia	77.9	74.7	81.0	6.3	0.7	78.6	75.5	81.6	6.1	0.0	78.6	75.5	81.8	6.3	0.7
Poland	77.8	73.7	81.7	8.0	0.2	78.0	74.1	81.9	7.8	0.4	78.4	74.6	82.1	7.5	0.6
Slovakia	77.0	73.3	80.5	7.2	0.8	77.8	74.3	81.2	6.9	0.4	78.2	74.9	81.5	6.6	1.2
Montenegro	76.5	74.1	78.9	4.8	0.2	76.7	74.0	79.5	5.5	0.9	77.6	75.1	80.2	5.1	1.1
Lithuania	74.7	69.2	80.1	10.9	1.8	76.5	71.6	81.2	9.6	1.1	77.6	72.9	81.9	9.0	2.9
Turkey	78.1	75.4	80.9	5.5	1.0	79.1	76.4	81.8	5.4	−1.8	77.3	74.8	79.8	5.0	−0.8
Hungary	76.0	72.3	79.4	7.1	0.5	76.5	73.1	79.7	6.6	0.2	76.7	73.4	79.9	6.5	0.7
Romania	75.0	71.3	78.7	7.4	0.6	75.6	71.9	79.5	7.6	0.8	76.4	72.6	80.4	7.8	1.4
Serbia	75.4	72.8	78.0	5.2	0.6	76.0	73.4	78.6	5.2	0.2	76.2	73.8	78.6	4.8	0.8
Bulgaria	74.5	71.1	78.0	6.9	0.6	75.1	71.6	78.8	7.2	0.7	75.8	72.0	79.7	7.7	1.3
Latvia	74.5	69.1	79.4	10.3	1.2	75.7	70.9	80.1	9.2	−0.1	75.6	70.5	80.6	10.1	1.1
Georgia	74.1	69.9	78.2	8.3	0.0	74.1	69.8	78.4	8.6	−0.4	73.7	69.9	77.5	7.6	−0.4
Moldova	—	—	—	—	—	—	—	—	—	—	71.9	67.5	76.4	8.9	—
Albania	78.2	76.4	80.1	3.7	0.9	79.1	77.6	80.7	3.1	—	—	—	—	—	—
North Macedonia	75.5	73.5	77.5	4.0	1.1	76.6	74.7	78.6	3.9	—	—	—	—	—	—
Azerbaijan	74.8	72.2	77.3	5.1	1.8	76.6	74.3	78.9	4.6	—	—	—	—	—	—
Armenia	—	—	—	—	—	76.6	73.1	79.7	6.6	—	—	—	—	—	—
Ukraine	71.8	66.6	76.7	10.1	1.6	73.4	68.4	78.3	9.9	—	—	—	—	—	—
UK	81.4	79.5	83.2	3.7	—	—	—	—	—	—	—	—	—	—	—
Belarus	73.3	67.8	78.6	10.8	—	—	—	—	—	—	—	—	—	—	—

== WHO (2019) ==
List of countries by life expectancy for 2019 according to the World Health Organization. The data is filtered according to the list of countries in Europe. In the WHO list and, accordingly, in this list, there are no mini-states with a population of several tens of thousands of people (Andorra, Liechtenstein, Monaco, San Marino, Vatican City).

World Health Organization (2019)
Countries	Life expectancy at birth					HALE at birth					Life expectancy at age 60					HALE at age 60					
Countries	All	M	F	FΔM	Δ 2000	All	M	F	FΔM	Δ 2000	All	M	F	FΔM	Δ 2000	All	M	F	FΔM	Δ 2000	
Switzerland	83.48	81.76	85.12	3.36	3.77	71.53	71.33	71.67	0.34	3.18	25.45	24.09	26.68	2.59	2.46	19.12	18.46	19.73	1.27	1.74	(Switzerland)
Spain	83.14	80.54	85.66	5.12	4.05	71.69	70.90	72.42	1.52	2.80	25.39	23.28	27.33	4.05	2.69	19.18	17.94	20.33	2.39	1.78	(Spain)
Italy	82.99	80.94	84.91	3.97	3.62	71.43	70.85	71.92	1.07	3.04	25.14	23.53	26.56	3.03	2.60	18.95	18.03	19.78	1.75	1.94	(Italy)
Luxembourg	82.80	80.83	84.74	3.91	4.38	71.46	70.98	71.89	0.91	3.61	24.73	23.13	26.22	3.09	2.85	18.83	17.97	19.64	1.67	2.10	(Luxembourg)
Sweden	82.71	81.17	84.24	3.07	3.14	71.41	71.33	71.46	0.13	2.15	24.78	23.57	25.91	2.34	2.36	18.80	18.26	19.32	1.06	1.57	(Sweden)
Norway	82.66	81.12	84.16	3.04	4.12	71.18	71.04	71.28	0.24	3.35	24.72	23.57	25.78	2.21	2.75	18.66	18.09	19.20	1.11	2.02	(Norway)
France	82.53	79.77	85.15	5.38	3.62	70.72	69.78	71.60	1.82	2.74	25.69	23.63	27.51	3.88	2.68	19.26	18.07	20.33	2.26	1.89	(France)
Iceland	82.47	81.10	83.90	2.80	2.78	71.39	71.30	71.46	0.16	2.25	24.82	23.96	25.67	1.71	2.20	19.07	18.68	19.45	0.77	1.70	(Iceland)
Netherlands	82.34	80.85	83.76	2.91	4.33	71.08	71.05	71.07	0.02	2.98	24.65	23.43	25.76	2.33	3.33	18.64	18.07	19.16	1.09	2.16	(Netherlands)
Cyprus	82.18	80.20	84.16	3.96	3.35	71.13	70.69	71.55	0.86	2.66	24.36	22.91	25.77	2.86	2.53	18.56	17.79	19.31	1.52	1.93	(Cyprus)
Malta	82.15	80.31	83.98	3.67	4.33	71.16	70.80	71.43	0.63	3.14	24.59	23.06	26.03	2.97	3.77	18.91	18.07	19.70	1.63	2.66	(Malta)
Ireland	81.94	80.27	83.60	3.33	5.52	70.48	70.25	70.71	0.46	4.16	24.26	23.00	25.48	2.48	4.07	18.53	17.90	19.14	1.24	2.97	(Republic of Ireland)
Austria	81.65	79.45	83.78	4.33	3.47	70.44	69.73	71.10	1.37	2.81	24.09	22.43	25.60	3.17	2.14	18.18	17.17	19.10	1.93	1.56	(Austria)
Finland	81.65	79.11	84.15	5.04	4.06	70.19	69.05	71.29	2.24	3.33	24.36	22.49	26.06	3.57	2.76	18.28	17.09	19.37	2.28	2.08	(Finland)
Belgium	81.61	79.50	83.66	4.16	3.94	70.10	69.61	70.55	0.94	2.89	24.23	22.60	25.72	3.12	2.59	18.18	17.34	18.96	1.62	1.73	(Belgium)
Portugal	81.37	78.38	84.15	5.77	4.78	70.06	68.81	71.20	2.39	4.01	24.20	21.97	26.15	4.18	2.98	18.40	17.04	19.60	2.56	2.25	(Portugal)
Slovenia	81.29	78.57	84.04	5.47	5.24	70.23	68.78	71.69	2.91	4.25	23.82	21.84	25.64	3.80	3.34	17.69	16.41	18.88	2.47	2.44	(Slovenia)
Denmark	81.28	79.49	83.06	3.57	4.35	70.31	69.86	70.75	0.89	3.65	23.55	22.18	24.85	2.67	2.92	18.10	17.33	18.84	1.51	2.30	(Denmark)
United Kingdom	81.22	79.50	82.92	3.42	3.36	69.74	69.38	70.07	0.69	2.46	24.12	22.91	25.25	2.34	2.81	18.25	17.64	18.82	1.18	1.96	(United Kingdom)
Germany	80.97	78.75	83.19	4.44	2.86	69.44	69.00	69.86	0.86	1.97	23.57	21.86	25.17	3.31	1.81	17.62	16.74	18.45	1.71	1.09	(Germany)
Greece	80.91	78.80	83.01	4.21	2.49	69.82	69.14	70.47	1.33	2.08	23.71	22.42	24.94	2.52	1.90	18.09	17.31	18.84	1.53	1.43	(Greece)
Czech Republic	79.14	76.30	81.93	5.63	4.11	68.49	66.92	70.01	3.09	3.18	22.08	19.93	24.00	4.07	2.75	16.32	14.87	17.62	2.75	1.92	(Czech Republic)
Estonia	78.89	74.69	82.61	7.92	7.92	68.37	65.80	70.59	4.79	6.52	22.50	19.20	24.96	5.76	3.89	16.93	14.66	18.63	3.97	2.87	(Estonia)
Croatia	78.60	75.58	81.59	6.01	3.85	68.38	66.66	70.07	3.41	3.15	21.87	19.71	23.79	4.08	2.50	16.34	14.92	17.61	2.69	1.79	(Croatia)
Europe	78.10	74.99	81.13	6.14	5.70	67.58	66.07	69.04	2.97	4.69	22.47	20.48	24.18	3.70	2.91	16.92	15.69	17.98	2.29	2.11	
Albania	77.94	76.17	79.87	3.70	4.26	68.41	67.48	69.43	1.95	3.93	20.92	20.08	21.89	1.81	1.82	16.24	15.66	16.90	1.24	1.50	(Albania)
Poland	77.73	73.94	81.50	7.56	4.03	67.56	65.08	70.01	4.93	3.39	21.80	19.23	24.00	4.77	2.60	16.31	14.49	17.86	3.37	1.98	(Poland)
Turkey	77.62	75.09	80.13	5.04	4.31	67.24	66.63	67.80	1.17	3.61	21.26	19.46	22.85	3.39	0.94	16.03	15.03	16.93	1.90	0.61	(Turkey)
Slovakia	77.61	74.23	80.90	6.67	4.29	67.48	65.48	69.41	3.93	3.62	21.43	18.97	23.51	4.54	2.92	15.99	14.32	17.42	3.10	2.20	(Slovakia)
Bosnia and Herzegovina	77.10	74.64	79.56	4.92	1.64	67.01	65.67	68.35	2.68	1.43	20.54	18.85	22.07	3.22	0.75	15.37	14.26	16.37	2.11	0.48	(Bosnia and Herzegovina)
Montenegro	76.84	73.89	79.73	5.84	3.41	67.25	65.61	68.85	3.24	2.82	20.25	18.04	22.24	4.20	1.31	15.39	13.89	16.74	2.85	0.91	(Montenegro)
Hungary	76.34	72.98	79.52	6.54	4.98	66.59	64.67	68.39	3.72	4.37	20.21	17.72	22.27	4.55	2.25	15.17	13.48	16.56	3.08	1.84	(Hungary)
Lithuania	76.25	71.45	80.82	9.37	4.25	66.23	63.10	69.17	6.07	3.67	21.22	17.87	23.80	5.93	1.79	15.84	13.41	17.70	4.29	1.29	(Lithuania)
North Macedonia	76.15	76.25	76.92	0.67	3.20	66.65	67.25	66.65	−0.60	2.75	19.32	20.37	19.23	−1.14	1.54	14.61	15.47	14.42	−1.05	1.15	(North Macedonia)
Serbia	75.92	73.26	78.46	5.20	4.42	66.55	65.08	67.94	2.86	3.65	19.73	17.93	21.23	3.30	2.62	14.96	13.76	15.97	2.21	1.87	(Serbia)
Azerbaijan	75.80	73.38	78.09	4.71	10.57	66.62	65.57	67.63	2.06	8.81	20.86	19.55	21.95	2.40	4.86	16.15	15.49	16.72	1.23	3.54	(Azerbaijan)
Latvia	75.68	71.05	79.97	8.92	5.47	66.02	63.05	68.74	5.69	4.82	20.77	17.44	23.26	5.82	2.46	15.60	13.24	17.37	4.13	1.87	(Latvia)
Armenia	75.67	70.82	79.79	8.97	4.05	66.48	63.56	68.96	5.40	3.51	20.10	16.81	22.61	5.80	2.12	15.45	13.30	17.09	3.79	1.56	(Armenia)
Romania	75.46	71.78	79.23	7.45	4.32	66.18	63.77	68.64	4.87	3.89	20.21	17.74	22.37	4.63	2.02	15.45	13.64	17.04	3.40	1.53	(Romania)
Bulgaria	75.00	71.52	78.62	7.10	3.36	65.67	63.46	67.95	4.49	2.91	19.70	17.24	21.92	4.68	2.10	14.99	13.25	16.55	3.30	1.58	(Bulgaria)
Belarus	74.82	69.73	79.66	9.93	6.03	65.44	62.14	68.56	6.42	5.23	19.67	16.07	22.49	6.42	2.55	14.88	12.30	16.90	4.60	1.93	(Belarus)
Georgia	73.85	69.10	78.44	9.34	2.78	64.85	61.61	67.98	6.37	2.08	19.05	16.01	21.50	5.49	0.98	14.60	12.47	16.31	3.84	0.51	(Georgia (country))
Moldova	73.32	69.32	77.17	7.85	7.66	64.43	62.01	66.75	4.74	6.41	19.02	16.63	20.92	4.29	4.09	14.49	12.87	15.79	2.92	3.01	(Moldova)
Russia	73.22	68.17	78.00	9.83	8.06	63.72	60.41	66.84	6.43	7.01	19.93	16.80	22.19	5.39	3.54	14.92	12.75	16.49	3.74	2.64	(Russia)
Kazakhstan	73.20	68.84	77.20	8.36	8.85	63.97	61.26	66.45	5.19	7.60	19.15	16.43	21.16	4.73	3.25	14.49	12.75	15.77	3.02	2.39	(Kazakhstan)
World	73.12	70.61	75.70	5.09	6.35	63.45	62.33	64.59	2.26	5.33	21.03	19.41	22.54	3.13	2.16	15.80	14.87	16.67	1.80	1.52	
Ukraine	73.00	67.99	77.81	9.82	5.45	63.47	60.10	66.70	6.60	4.68	19.49	16.43	21.73	5.30	2.72	14.66	12.53	16.21	3.68	2.14	(Ukraine)

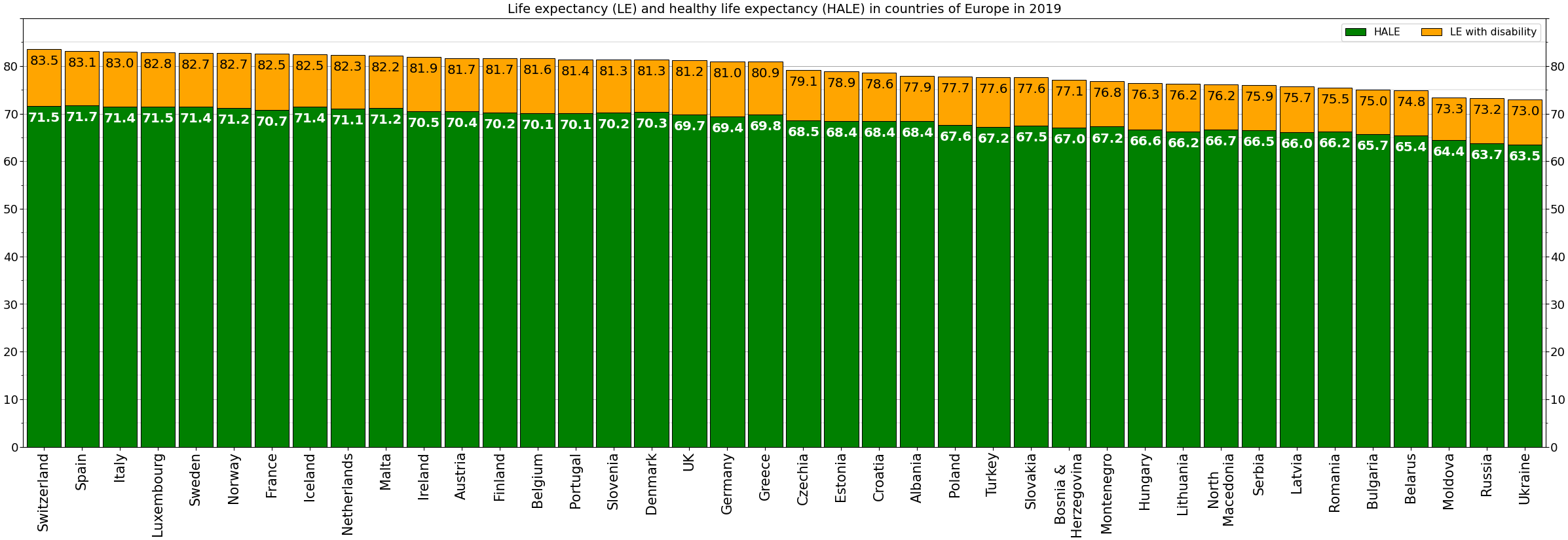
Life expectancy and HALE in countries of Europe in 2019

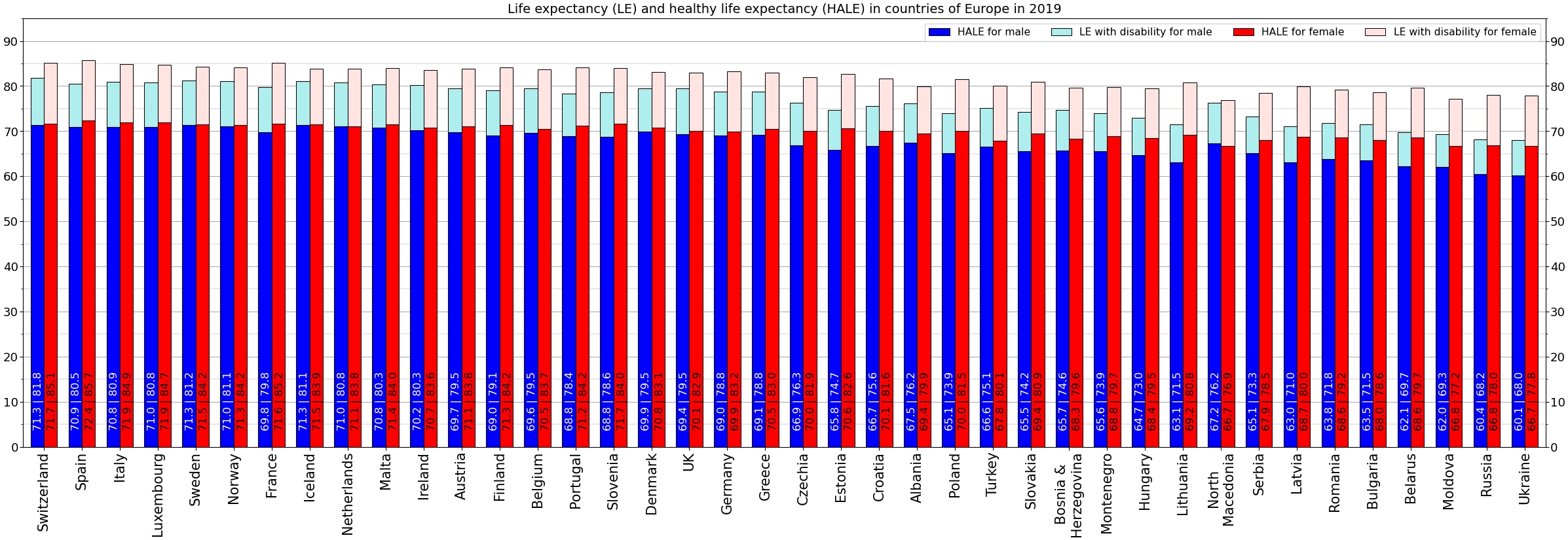
Elaboration by sex

Interactive chart of male and female life expectancy in Europe as defined by WHO for 2019. Open the original chart and hover over chart elements. The squares of bubbles are proportional to population according to estimation of the UN for 2019.

== Charts and maps ==
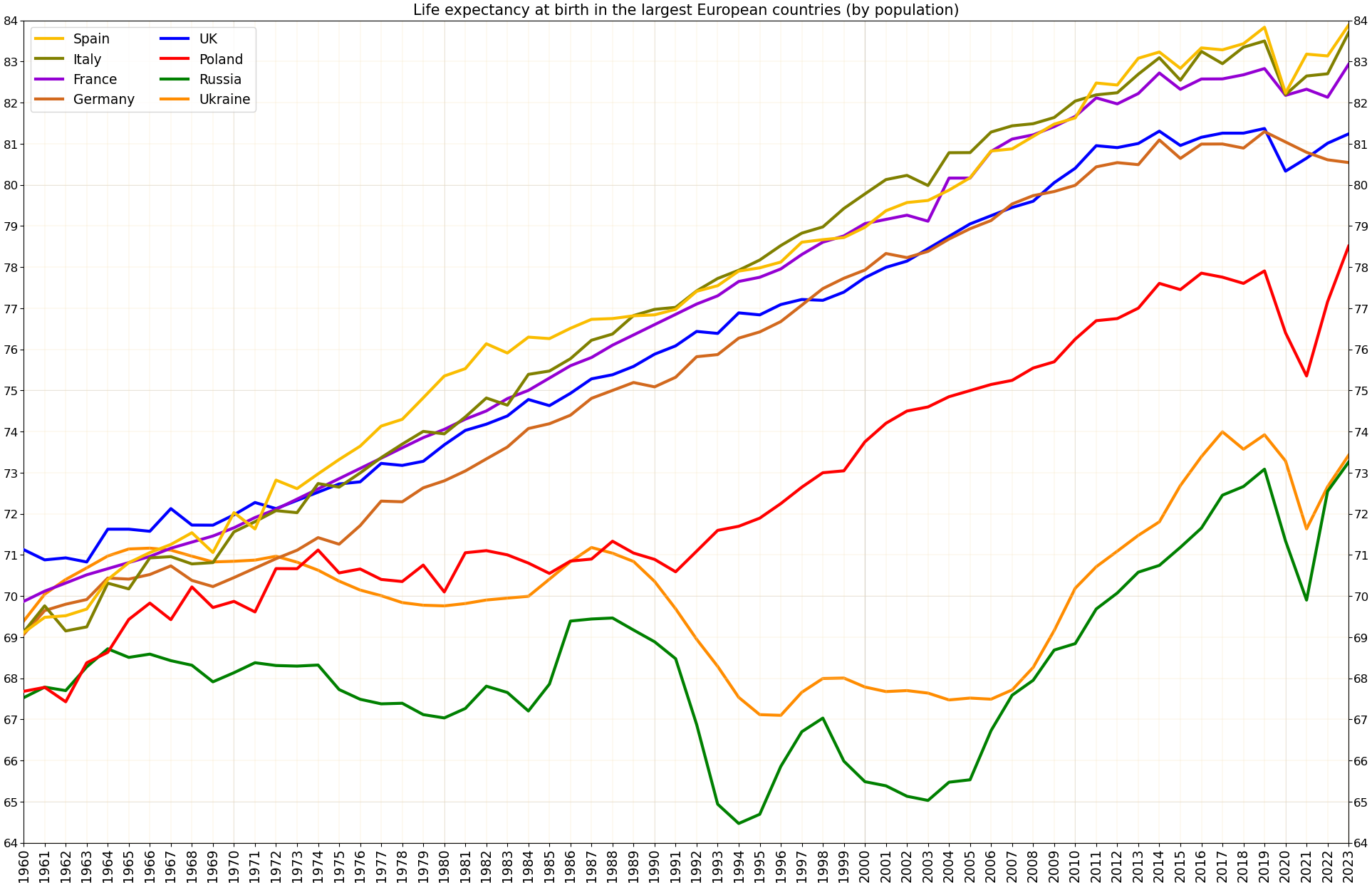
Life expectancy in the largest by population European countries

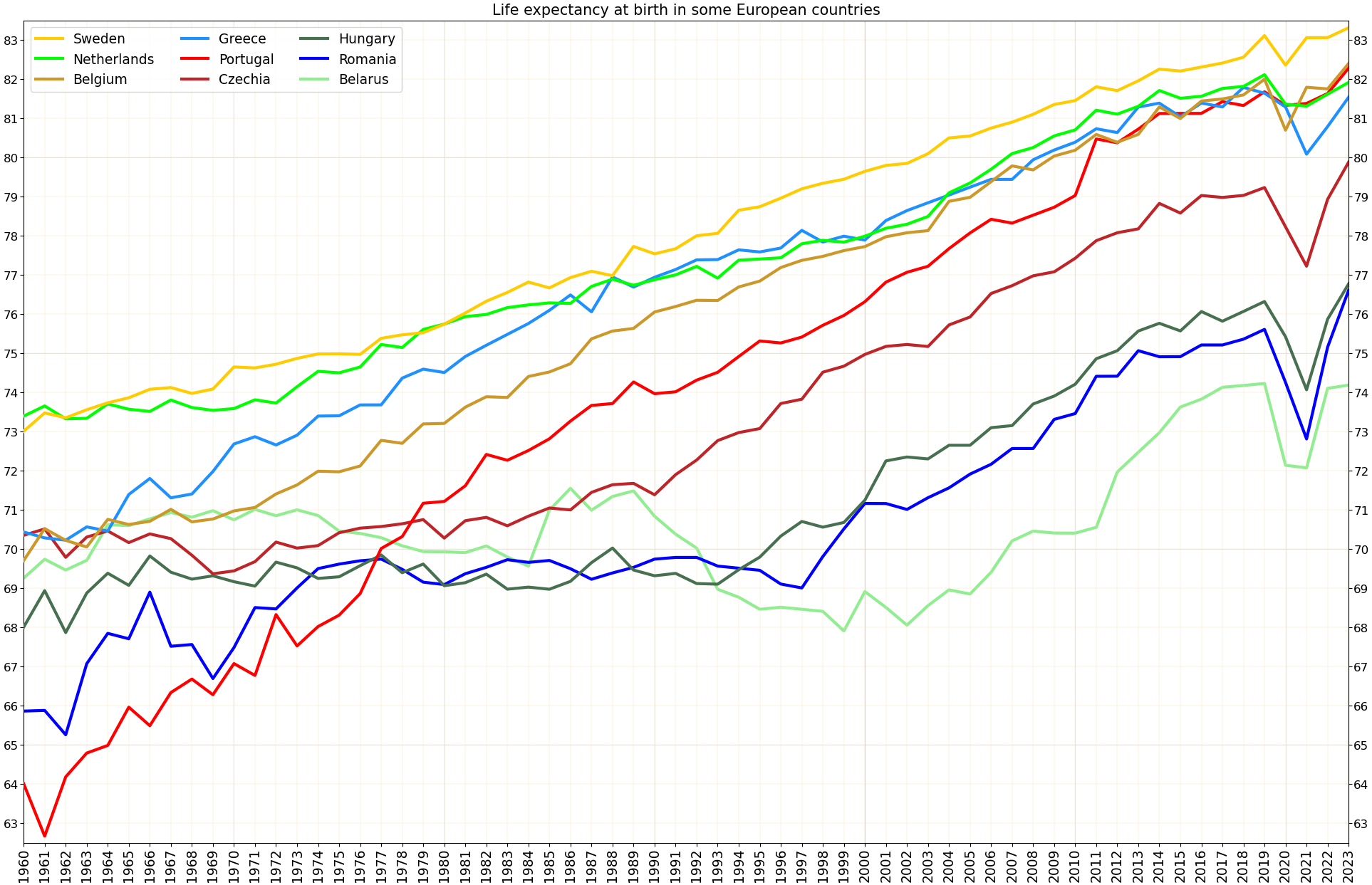
Life expectancy in some European countries
(continue)

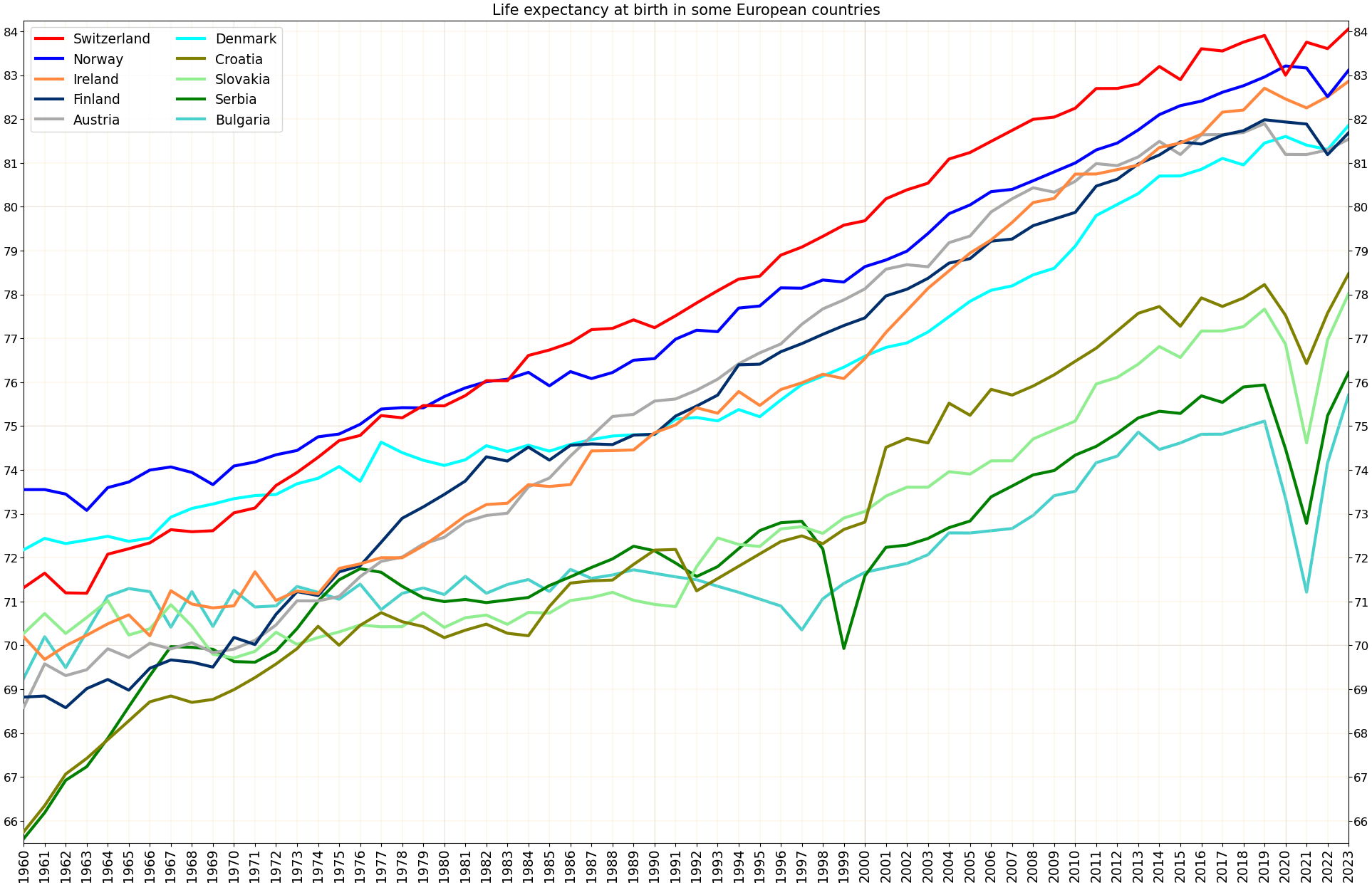
Life expectancy in some European countries
(continue)

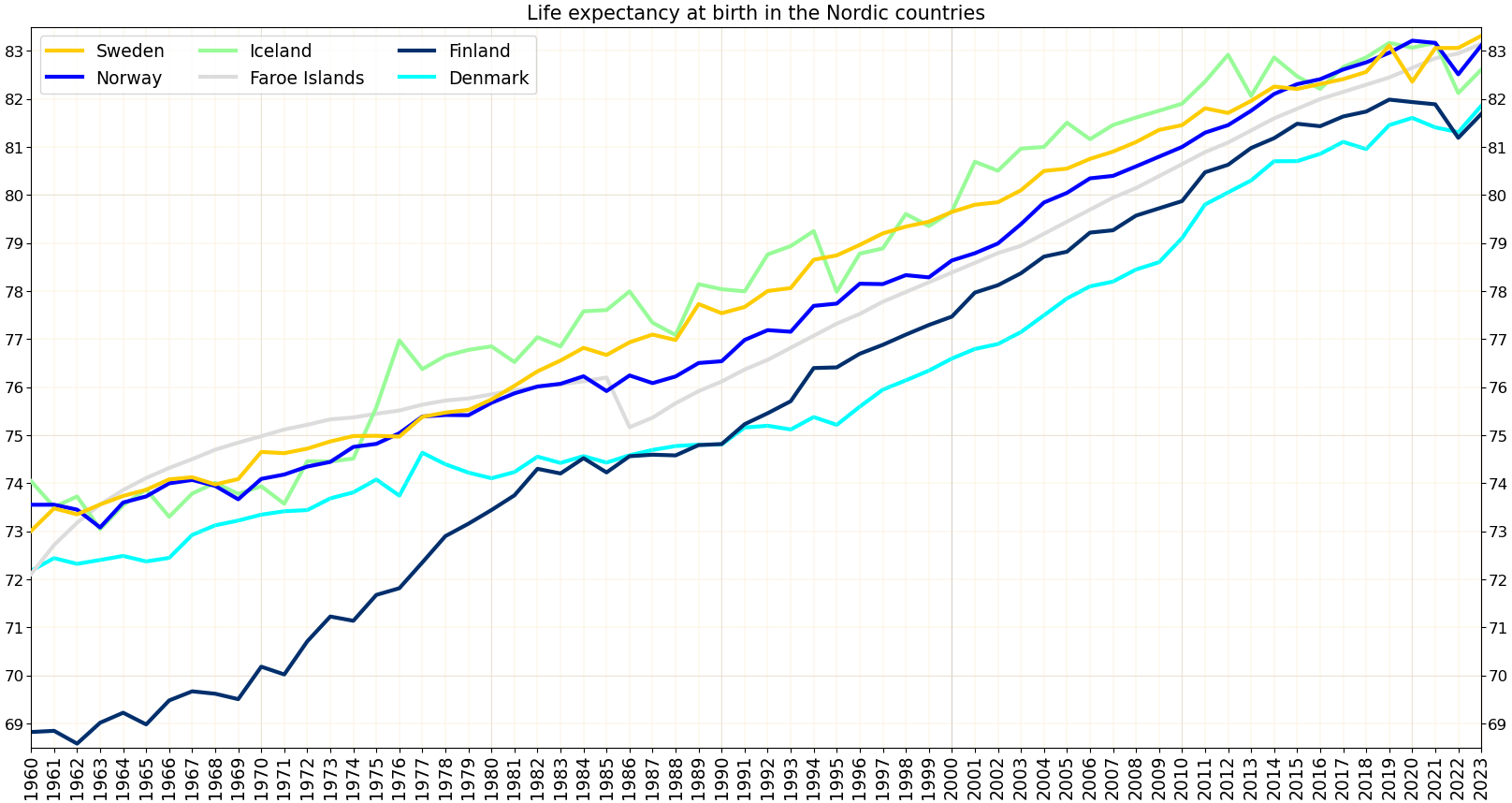
Life expectancy in the Nordic countries

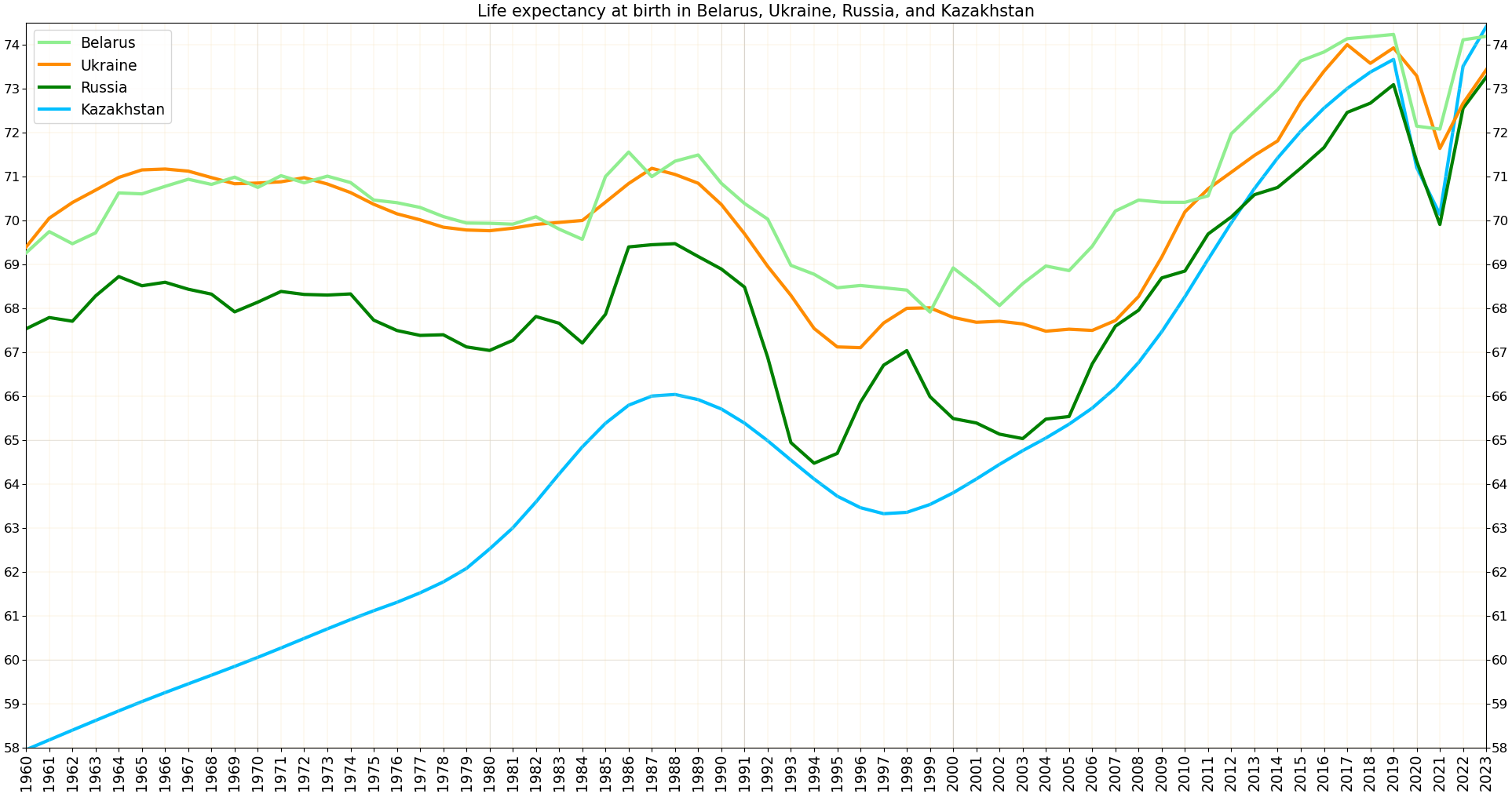
Life expectancy in the largest post-USSR countries located at the territory of Europe

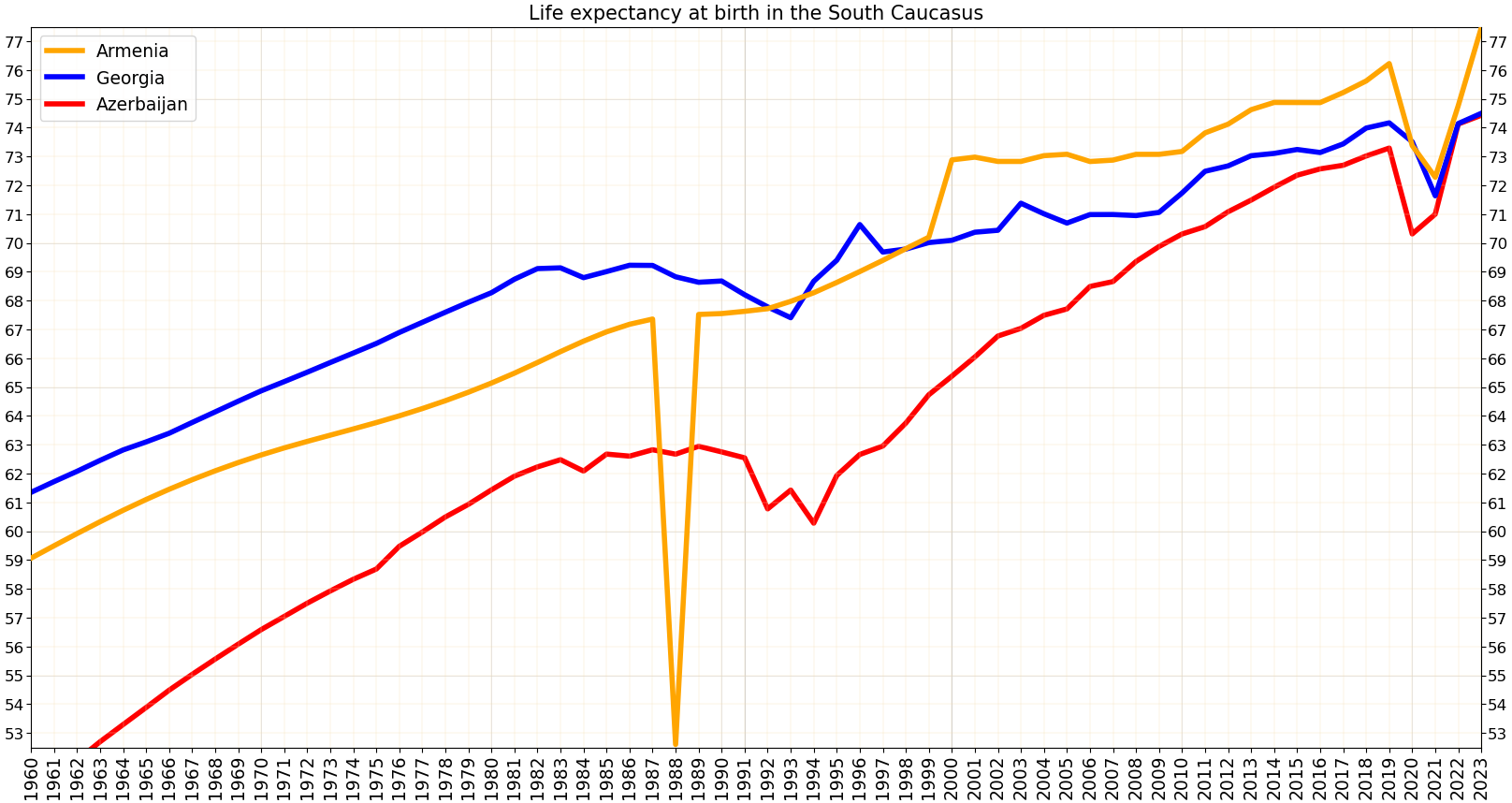
Development of life expectancy in the countries of the South Caucasus

Map of the European countries by life expectancy in 2020 according to the World Bank: More than 82 years Between 80 and 82 years Between 78 and 80 years / Between 75 and 78 years Between 73 and 75 years Less than 73 years No data

== See also ==
- List of countries by life expectancy
- List of European Union countries by life expectancy
- List of European regions by life expectancy
- List of European countries by population
- List of German states by life expectancy
- List of Spanish provinces by life expectancy
- List of Italian provinces by life expectancy
- List of French departments by life expectancy
- List of British regions by life expectancy
- List of Swedish counties by life expectancy
- List of Finnish regions by life expectancy
- List of federal subjects of Russia by life expectancy
- List of oldest people
- Longevity
- Life extension

=== Plotted maps ===
- European countries by electricity consumption per person
- European countries by employment in agriculture (% of employed)
- European countries by fossil fuel use (% of total energy)
- European countries by health expense per person
- European countries by military expenditure as a percentage of government expenditure
- European countries by percent of population aged 0-14
- European countries by percentage of urban population
- European countries by percentage of women in national parliaments
- List of European countries by number of Internet users
- International organisations in Europe
- List of European countries by budget revenues
- List of European countries by budget revenues per capita
- List of European countries by GDP (nominal) per capita
- List of European countries by GDP (PPP) per capita
- List of European countries by GNI (nominal) per capita
- List of European countries by GNI (PPP) per capita
- List of countries by GDP (nominal) per capita
- List of countries by GDP (PPP) per capita
- List of countries by GDP (nominal)
- List of countries by GDP (PPP)
