= European countries by percentage of urban population =

This is a list of European countries of urban population. The three most urban countries as of 2023 were Monaco (100% urban), Belgium (98%), and San Marino (98%), whereas the three least urban countries as of 2023 were Liechtenstein (15%), Moldova (43%), and Bosnia and Herzegovina (50%).

== Map ==
The map data is for the year 2014 from the World Bank. Numbers are in percentage.

== Table ==
The table uses 2014, 2015 and 2018 data from the World Bank. Numbers are as a percentage.

Country	2014	2015	2018	2023
Albania	56	57 ▲1	60 ▲3	65 ▲5
Andorra	86	85 ▼1	88 ▲3	88
Austria	66	66	66	60 ▼6
Belarus	75	77 ▲2	78 ▲1	81 ▲3
Belgium	98	98	98	98
Bosnia and Herzegovina	40	40	48 ▲8	50 ▲2
Bulgaria	72	74 ▲2	75 ▲1	77 ▲2
Croatia	58	59 ▲1	57 ▼2	59 ▲2
Cyprus	68	67 ▼1	67	67
(Czech Republic) Czechia	73	73	74 ▲1	75 ▲1
Denmark	87	88 ▲1	88	88
Estonia	68	68	69 ▲1	70 ▲1
Finland	84	84	85 ▲1	86 ▲1
France	78	80 ▲2	80	82 ▲2
(Georgia (country)) Georgia	57	57	58 ▲1	61 ▲3
Germany	74	75 ▲1	77 ▲2	78 ▲1
Greece	76	78 ▲2	79 ▲1	81 ▲2
Hungary	69	71 ▲2	71	73 ▲2
Iceland	94	94	94	94
(Republic of Ireland) Ireland	62	63 ▲1	63	64 ▲1
Italy	68	69 ▲1	70 ▲1	72 ▲2
Kazakhstan	55	56 ▲1	58 ▲2	58
Latvia	68	67 ▼1	68 ▲1	69 ▲1
Liechtenstein	14	14	14	15 ▲1
Lithuania	67	67	68 ▲1	69 ▲1
Luxembourg	89	90 ▲1	91 ▲1	92 ▲1
Malta	95	95	95	95
Moldova	45	45	43 ▼2	43
Monaco	100	100	100	100
Montenegro	63	64 ▲1	67 ▲3	69 ▲2
Netherlands	87	90 ▲3	91 ▲1	93 ▲2
North Macedonia	57	57	58 ▲1	59 ▲1
Norway	79	80 ▲1	82 ▲2	84 ▲2
Poland	61	61	60 ▼1	60
Portugal	61	63 ▲2	65 ▲2	68 ▲3
Romania	54	55 ▲1	54 ▼1	55 ▲1
Russia	74	74	74	75 ▲1
San Marino	94	94	97 ▲3	98 ▲1
Serbia	55	56 ▲1	56	57 ▲1
Slovakia	54	54	54	54
Slovenia	50	50	55 ▲5	56 ▲1
Spain	78	80 ▲2	80	82 ▲2
Sweden	86	86	87 ▲1	89 ▲2
Switzerland	74	74	74	74
Turkey	71	73 ▲2	75 ▲2	77 ▲2
Ukraine	69	70 ▲1	69 ▼1	70 ▲1
United Kingdom	82	83 ▲1	83	85 ▲2

== See also ==
=== Plotted maps ===
- European countries by electricity consumption per person
- European countries by employment in agriculture (% of employed)
- European countries by fossil fuel use (% of total energy)
- European countries by health expense per person
- European countries by military expenditure as a percentage of government expenditure
- European countries by percent of population aged 0-14
- European countries by percentage of women in national parliaments
- List of sovereign states in Europe by life expectancy
- List of sovereign states in Europe by number of Internet users
