= Economy of Georgia (country) =

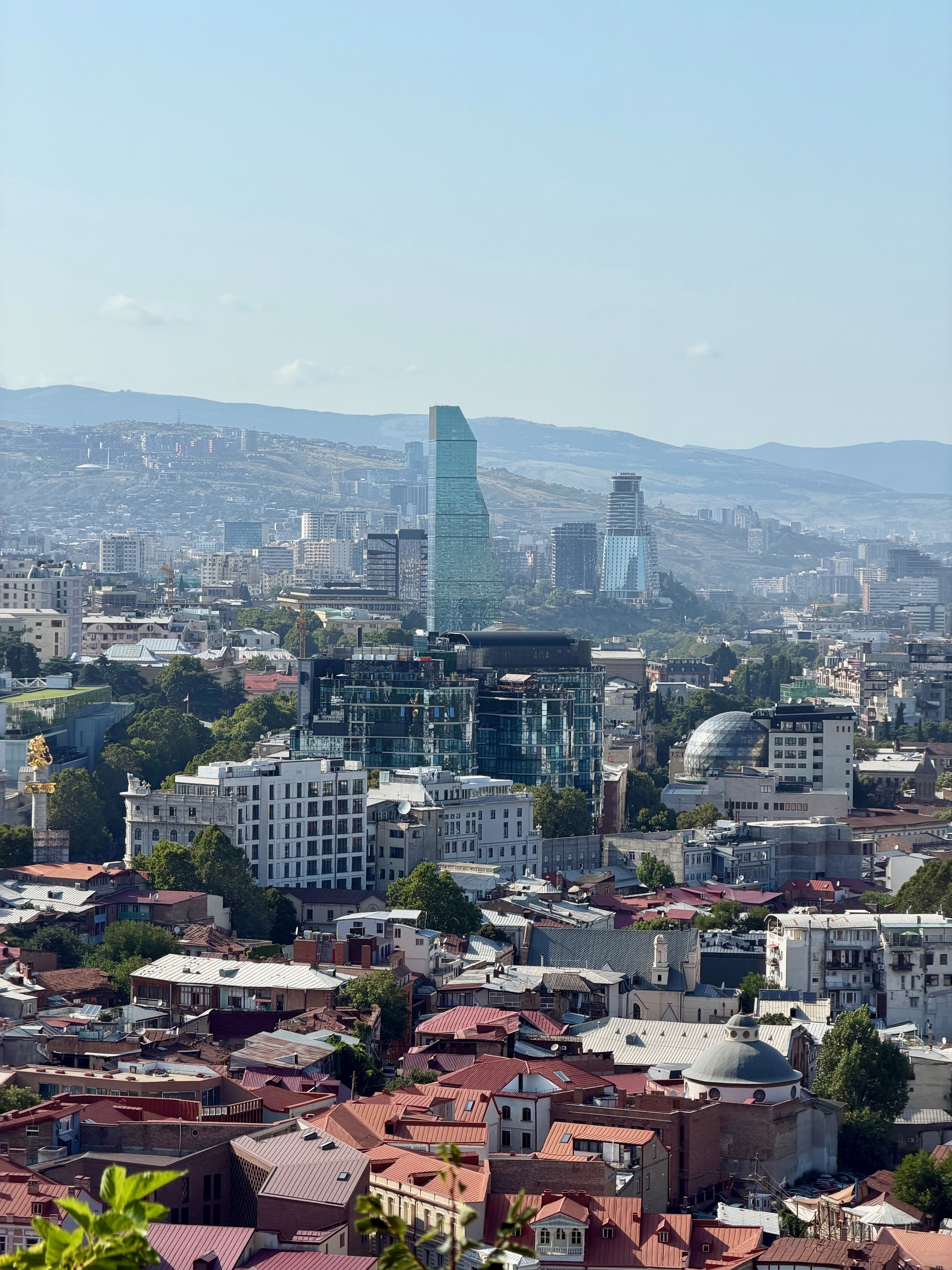
- Tbilisi, the country's capital and its most significant economic center
- Currency: Georgian lari (GEL, ₾)
- Fiscal year: Calendar year
- Trade organisations: WTO, GUAM, BSEC and others
- Country group: Developing country; Upper-middle income economy

Statistics
- Population: ▲3,941,000 (1 January 2026)
- GDP: ▲$42.72 billion (nominal; 2026); ▲$125.45 billion (PPP; 2026)
- GDP rank: 103th (nominal; 2026); 98th (PPP; 2026)
- GDP growth: ▲8.4% (2025); ▲7.0% (2026); ▲5% (2027)
- GDP per capita: ▲$11,574 (nominal; 2026); ▲$33,999 (PPP; 2025)
- GDP per capita rank: 83rd (nominal; 2026); 68th (PPP; 2026)
- GDP per capita growth: 4.1% (real; 2025)
- GDP by sector: Wholesale and retail trade; repair of motor vehicles and motorcycles – 15.2%; Real estate activities – 9.9%; Manufacturing – 9.3%; Construction – 8.4%; Public administration and defence; compulsory social security – 7%; Information and communication – 6.4%; Agriculture, forestry and fishing – 6.2%; Transportation and storage – 5.9%; Other sectors – 31.8%; (2024)
- GDP by component: Final consumption: 84.8%; Gross capital formation: 22.9%; Exports of goods and services: 48.3%; Imports of goods and services: −55.9%; (2024)
- Inflation (CPI): ▲4.4% (2026)
- Population below national poverty line: 13.1% in poverty (2023); 48% on less than $6.85/day (2022)
- Gini coefficient: 33.5 medium (2022)
- Human Development Index: 0.844 very high (2023) (57th); 0.754 high real (2023, IHDI 50th)
- Corruption Perceptions Index: 53 out of 100 points (2024, 53rd rank)
- Labour force: ▲1,853,718 (2024); ▲56% employment rate (2020)
- Labour force by occupation: agriculture: 8.2%; industry: 23.7%; services: 67.9%; (2017 est.)
- Unemployment: ▼13.9% (2024)
- Youth unemployment: ▲30.3% (2025)
- Informal employment: 37% (2024)
- Average gross salary: GEL 2,466 / €800/ $927 monthly (2025)
- Average net salary: GEL 1,972.8 / €636 / $741 monthly (2025*)
- Main industries: steel, machine tools, electrical appliances, mining (manganese, copper, gold), chemicals, wood products, wine

External
- Exports: ▲$7.3 billion (2025)
- Export goods: vehicles, ferro-alloys, fertilizers, nuts, scrap metal, gold, copper ores
- Main export partners: EEU 48.13%; Kyrgyzstan 18%; Kazakhstan 11.6%; Russia 9.55%; EU 10.65%; Bulgaria 1.71%; Netherlands 1.26%; Azerbaijan 9.98%; Turkey 7.36%; China 4.26%; Switzerland 3%; United States 2.4% (2024)
- Imports: ▲$18.529 billion (2025)
- Import goods: fuels, vehicles, machinery and parts, grain and other foods, pharmaceuticals
- Main import partners: EU 26.24%; Germany 7.26%; Italy 2.36%; Poland 1.82%; Turkey 15.6%; EEU 13.03%; Russia 10.2%; Armenia 1.32%; United States 11.4%; China 8.91%; United Kingdom 4.35%; Azerbaijan 3.28% (2024)
- FDI stock: ▲$17.47 billion (31 December 2017 est.); ▲ Abroad: $2.477 billion (31 December 2017 est.)
- Current account: ▲ −$1.348 billion (2017 est.)
- Gross external debt: ▲$16.99 billion (31 December 2017 est.)

Public finance
- Government debt: ▲34% of GDP (2025) (Note: data cover general government debt and include debt instruments issued (or owned) by government entities other than the treasury; the data include treasury debt held by foreign entities; the data include debt issued by subnational entities; Georgia does not maintain intragovernmental debt or social funds)
- Foreign reserves: ▲$8.1 billion (31 september 2026 est.)
- Budget balance: −2.5% (of GDP) (2025 est.)
- Revenue: 4.352 billion (2017 est.)
- Spending: 4.925 billion (2017 est.)
- Economic aid: ODA $626.0 million USD (2010)
- Credit rating: Standard & Poor's: BB− (Domestic); BB− (Foreign); BB (T&C Assessment); Outlook: Stable; Moody's: Ba3; Outlook: Stable; Fitch: BB−; Outlook: Stable; Scope: BB; Outlook: Negative
- All values, unless otherwise stated, are in US dollars.

The economy of Georgia is an emerging free market economy. Its gross domestic product fell sharply following the dissolution of the Soviet Union but recovered in the mid-2000s, growing in double digits thanks to the economic and democratic reforms brought by the peaceful Rose Revolution. Georgia continued its economic progress since "moving from a near-failed state in 2003 to a relatively well-functioning market economy in 2014". In 2007, the World Bank named Georgia the World's number one economic reformer.

Georgia's economy is supported by a relatively free and transparent atmosphere in the country. According to Transparency International's 2018 report, Georgia is the least corrupt nation in the Black Sea region, outperforming all of its immediate neighbors, as well as nearby European Union states. With a mixed news media environment, Georgia is also the only country in its immediate neighborhood where the press is not deemed unfree.

Since 2014, Georgia is part of the European Union's Free Trade Area, with the EU continuing to be the country's largest trading partner, accounting for over a quarter of Georgia's total trade turnover. Following the EU trade pact, 2015 was marked by further increase in bilateral trade, whereas trade with the Commonwealth of Independent States (CIS) decreased precipitously.

== History ==
=== 19th century ===
Until the mid 19th century, Georgia's economy was almost entirely based on a feudal system where serfs worked the land for noble landowners known as Tavadis. Even after the abolition of serfdom in Georgia (starting in 1864), the economy remained overwhelmingly rural.

While Georgia remained largely agrarian economy before the 20th century, the country's strategic location and access to the sea provided it with large investments spearheaded by highly influential individuals. Batumi port gained huge interest among the elite class, most notably the Rothschild and Nobel families. Their massive investments in the Baku-Batumi railway and the world's first major kerosene pipeline transformed the city into a global energy hub, connecting the Caspian oil fields to European markets.

By the turn of the century, Chiatura's massive manganese deposits were responsible for huge portion of all global production. By 1913 Chiatura was the main exporter of Manganese ore - supplying 50% of the world markets.

=== 20th-21st Centuries ===
Georgia's modern economy has traditionally revolved around Black Sea tourism, cultivation of citrus fruits (in particular, tangerines), tea and grapes; mining of manganese and copper; and the output of a large industrial sector producing wine, metals, machinery, chemicals, and textiles.

Like many post-Soviet countries, Georgia went through a period of sharp economic decline during the 1990s, partially due to persistent tax evasion. "During that period, international financial institutions played a critical role in Georgia's budgetary calculations. Multilateral and bilateral grants and loans totaled 116.4 million lari in 1997; they totaled 182.8 million lari in 1998."

Economic recovery had been hampered by the separatist disputes in Abkhazia and South Ossetia, resistance to reform on the part of some corrupt and reactionary factions, and the 1997 Asian financial crisis. Under the leadership of President Shevardnadze (in office 1995–2003), the government nonetheless made some progress on basic market reforms: it liberalized all prices and most trade, introduced a stable national currency (the lari), and massively downsized government.

During the late 1990s more than 10,500 small enterprises had been privatized, and although privatization of medium- and large-sized firms had been slow, more than 1,200 medium – and large-sized companies had been set up as joint stock companies. A law and a decree establishing the legal basis and procedures for state property privatization reduced the number of companies controlled by the state.

The United States began assisting Georgia in the process of reform soon after the country gained independence from the Soviet Union. Gradually, the focus shifted from humanitarian to technical and institution-building programs. Provision of legal and technical advisors was complemented by training opportunities for parliamentarians, law enforcement officials, and economic advisers.

== Recent macroeconomic performance ==
Over the last few years, the Georgian economy has been one of the fastest in the FSU. Since 2003's Rose Revolution, the new Government of Georgia implemented broad and comprehensive reforms, that touched every aspect of the country's life. Economic reforms were addressed to liberalization of the economy and provision of sustainable economic growth, based on the private sector development. The establishment of an attractive business environment led to a significant inflow of Foreign Direct Investment in the country, facilitating high economic growth rates.

In 2013, Georgia ranked in the top ten countries in the Emerging Market Energy Security Growth Prosperity Index, according to an article published by CISTRAN Finance news. The index identifies emerging nations that have strong growth potential based on energy reserves and GDP.

Following reforms, Georgia's economy successfully diversified and began showing rapid upward growth, averaging over 10% annual real GDP growth from 2004 to 2007, peaking at 12.3 percent in 2007. Overall, from 2004 to 2007, the economy of Georgia expanded by 35%.

Georgia's economic liberalization policy demonstrated some resilience to the external shocks of the 2008 South Ossetia war and the 2008 financial crisis. Despite this, in 2008, the Georgia economy grew by 2.3%. After contracting in 2009 (−3.8%), the economy recovered soon after, growing 6.3% in 2010 and 7.0% in 2011. The unemployment rate shrunk from 16.9% to 16.3% between 2009 and 2010.

In 2013, the annual inflation rate in Georgia equaled 2.4%. It has been decreased significantly after 11.2% in 2010. Growth of inflation rate was the result of increasing food prices in the world and essential share of the inflation fluctuations came on variability of food prices, as far as the share of food is relatively high in consumer basket of Georgia.

In 2011, IMF estimated current account balance of Georgia was −1.489 BN USD. Georgia has moderate deficits among the European and Transcaucasian Post-Soviet states. The trade with Georgia's major partners continued growing. As an example, in 2017, Georgia exported $87,263,530 worth of products to Armenia, and imported $144,931,920 worth of products from Armenia. Deficits in the current account have been more than offset by strong foreign capital inflows, allowing the Georgian currency to appreciate.

Evolution of GDP per capita (PPP) in Georgia and other FSC between 1994–2021 and future projections for 2022–2026

Rank	Country	Current account balance as a percentage of GDP (2010)	2011 IMF estimates
1	Azerbaijan	27.662	22.664
2	Russia	4.807	5.518
3	Ukraine	−2.091	−3.893
4	Armenia	−13.873	−11.697
5	Belarus	−15.522	−13.442
6	Lithuania	1.835	−1.860
7	Moldova	−8.300	−9.897
8	Estonia	3.565	2.424
9	Georgia	−9.618	−11.700
10	Latvia	−22.938	−8.320

The government has managed to preserve financial stability thanks to the considerable aid provided by the US and international institutions. EBRD analysts believe that substantial international financial support and remittances from workers living abroad will cover the current account deficit in the medium term. IMF positively evaluated the government's economic policy.

	2015	2016	2017	2018	2019*	2020	2021	2022
GDP at current prices, billion GEL	33.9	35.8	40.8	44.6	50.0	49.4	60.0	
GDP at constant 2015 prices, billion GEL	33.9	34.9	36.6	38.4	40.4	37.8	41.5	
GDP real growth, percent	3.0	2.9	4.8	4.8	5.1	−6.2	10.5	10.8
GDP deflator, percent	5.8	2.6	8.5	4.4	6.6	6.9	10.3	
GDP per capita (at current prices), GEL	9 109.4	9 613.9	10 933.9	11 968.0	13 428.9	13 292.7	16 179.5	
GDP per capita (at current prices), USD	4 012.6	4 062.1	4 358.5	4 722.0	4 763.5	4 274.6	5 023.2	
GDP at current prices, billion USD	14.9	15.1	16.2	17.6	17.7	15.9	18.6	

== Sectors ==
=== Agriculture ===
Currently, about 55% of the total labor force is employed in agriculture, though much of this is subsistence farming.

Georgian agricultural production is beginning to recover following the devastation caused by the civil unrest and the necessary restructuring following the breakup of the Soviet Union. Livestock production is beginning to rebound, although it continues to be confronted by minor and sporadic disease outbreaks. Domestic grain production is increasing, and the government invests in improvement of infrastructure improvements to ensure appropriate distribution and revenues to farmers. Tea, hazelnut and citrus production have suffered greatly as a result of the conflict in Abkhazia, a crucial area for planting the latter crops.

Approximately 7% of the Georgian GDP (2011) is generated by the agrarian sector.

Viticulture and winemaking are the most important fields of Georgia's agriculture. Over 450 species of local vine are bred in Georgia, and the country is considered as one of the oldest places of producing top-quality wines in the world. Russia was traditionally the biggest export market for Georgian wine. This, however, changed in 2006, when Russia banned imports of wine and mineral water from Georgia, preceded by statements of Georgian governmental officials about low quality requirements of the Russian market. Since then Georgian wine producers have struggled to maintain output and break into new markets.

In 2011 Georgia sold wine in total amount of 54 mln USD in 48 countries and alcoholic beverages in total amount of 68 mln USD in 32 countries. Vines and alcoholic beverages are in the top 10 export commodity's list with 2,5% and 3.1% share respectively. According to National Wine Agency of Georgia, export of Georgian wine is increasing. 2011 wine export is 109% higher than 2007 exports. According to 2012 information, Georgia trades wine with 43 countries, selling over 23 million bottles. Biggest export partners for Georgia in wine industry are Ukraine (47.3% of wine export), Kazakhstan (18.9%) and Belarus (6.9%). In 2011 export of vines, mineral waters and alcoholic beverages exceeded export of all years after 2006. Georgia is rich with spring waters and production of mineral waters is one of the main spheres of industry. Export of mineral waters in 2011 amounted to 48 mln USD in 35 countries. Share of mineral water in total export is 2.1%. Food processing industry is developing to align with the primary agricultural production and export of processed products is increasing year by year. Export of nuts constituted about 6% of Georgian export (2011) and is among 10 top export commodity list with total amount of 130 mln USD. Nuts was exported in 53 countries.

Rural population as a percentage of total population in Georgia was 48.2% in 2011 and decreased to 46.3% in 2014.

In 2018, in addition to smaller productions of other agricultural products, Georgia had produced:

- 259 thousand tons of grape;
- 237 thousand tons of potato;
- 194 thousand tons of maize;
- 107 thousand tons of wheat;
- 82 thousand tons of apple;
- 62 thousand tons of tangerine;
- 57 thousand tons of barley;
- 57 thousand tons of watermelon;
- 51 thousand tons of tomato;
- 33 thousand tons of cucumber;
- 27 thousand tons of peach.

=== Mining ===
Mining has been conducted in Georgia for centuries. Today, Georgia's mineral industry produces manganese, copper and various types of quarried stone. Although the Georgian economy has experienced significant economic growth in recent years, growth in the mining and metallurgical sector has lagged behind that of the overall economy.

=== Construction ===
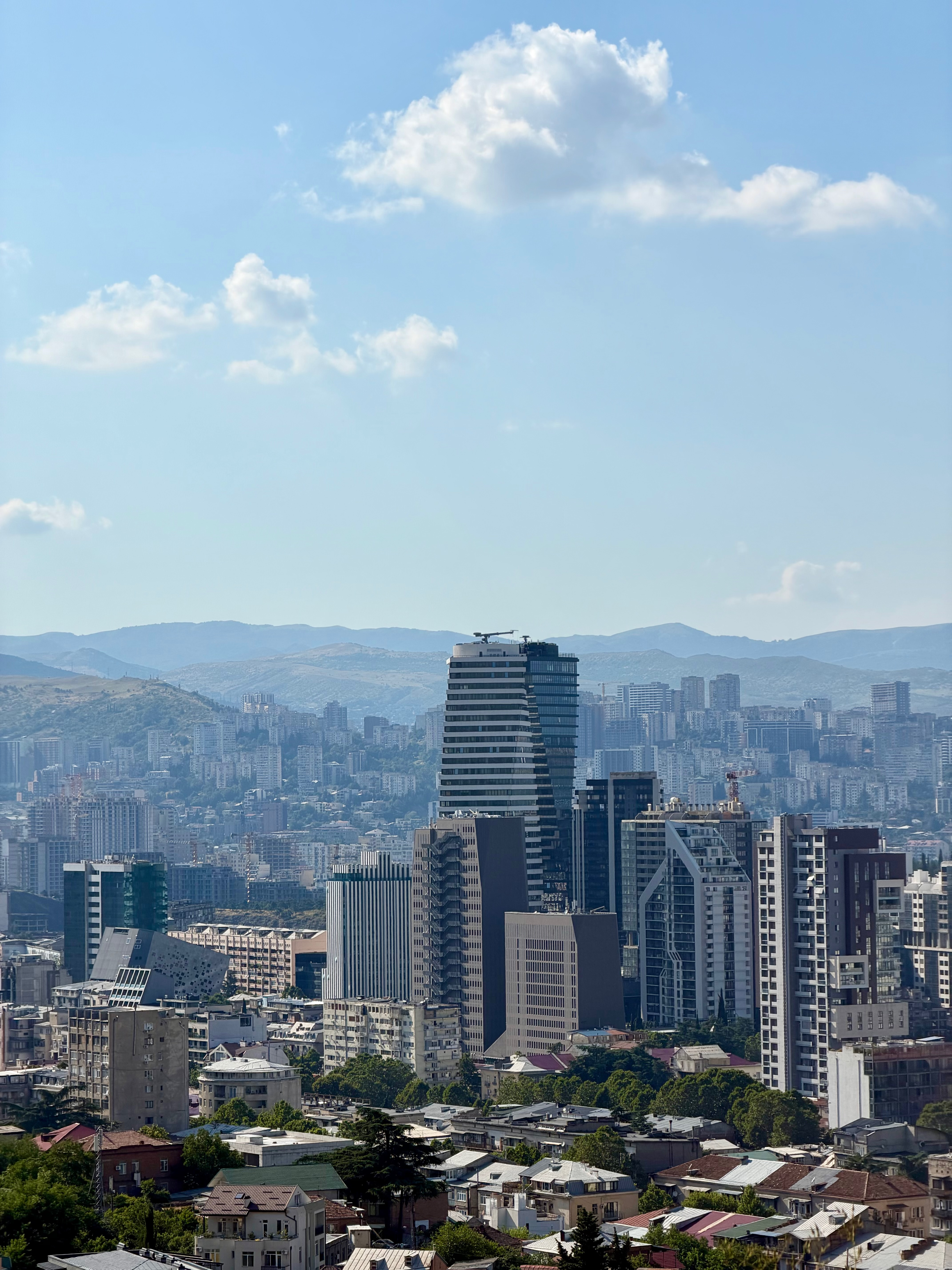
Some of the new high-rise buildings from Georgia's ongoing construction boom

=== Finance ===
Bank of Georgia headquarters in Tbilisi

Like most other post-soviet countries, Georgia's finance sector is dominated by banks. As of 2015, there were 21 commercial banks, of which 5 large banks controlled most of financial assets. There are some major challenges facing the banking sector. For instance, banks play a limited role in financing the real economy and in investing in activities that are required to stabilize the country's persistent trade.

=== Education ===
Education in Georgia is free of charge and compulsory for eight years, from the age of 6 until the age of 14. Children in Georgia are legally required to have a basic primary education. Even though education is not compulsory for children who are older than 14, most adolescents in the country are expected to stay in school for a total of 12 years, until they are 17 or 18 years old, primarily so that they can complete their education. In 1996, the gross primary enrollment rate was 88.2%, and the net primary enrollment rate was 87%; 48.8% are girls and 51.8% are boys. The constitution mandates that education is free. Related expenses that include textbooks and laptops are provided by the state free of charge; in 2001, there were 47,837 children not attending primary school.

The Human Rights Measurement Initiative (HRMI) finds that Georgia is fulfilling only 94.3% of what it should be fulfilling for the right to education based on the country's level of income. HRMI breaks down the right to education by looking at the rights to both primary education and secondary education. While taking into consideration Georgia's income level, the nation is achieving 90.7% of what should be possible based on its resources (income) for primary education and 97.8% for secondary education.

=== Healthcare ===
Healthcare in Georgia is provided by a universal health care system under which the state funds medical treatment in a mainly privatized system of medical facilities. In 2013, the enactment of a universal health care program triggered universal coverage of government-sponsored medical care of the population and improving access to health care services. Responsibility for purchasing publicly financed health services lies with the Social Service Agency (SSA).

The Human Rights Measurement Initiative finds that Georgia is fulfilling 76.3% of what it should be fulfilling for the right to health based on its level of income. When looking at the right to health with respect to children, Georgia achieves 98.1% of what is expected based on its current income. In regards to the right to health amongst the adult population, the country achieves only 86.8% of what is expected based on the nation's level of income. Georgia falls into the "very bad" category when evaluating the right to reproductive health because the nation is fulfilling only 44.0% of what the nation is expected to achieve based on the resources (income) it has available.

=== Tourism ===
Tourism in Georgia is one of the fastest growing sectors of the local economy, which has high potential for further development. During recent years the number of visitors to Georgia increased significantly contributing to the growth of other tourism related sectors. In 2011, about 3 million visitors visited Georgia, 40 percent more than in 2010. To foster the development of the tourism sector the Government of Georgia invests heavily in the development of the transportation and basic infrastructure, renovation and development of tourism destinations, which is a stimulus for the private investment generation. In 2011, total output of tourism related services production increased by 77% compared to 2006 and constituted 7.1% of total output of economy. In 2018 tourism generated 3.4 billion dollars in tax revenue for Georgia.

The following table shows the monthly average for incoming tourists in Georgia by citizenship and number of visits (in thousands).

Country	2015	2016	2017	2018	Change 2015–2018
Azerbaijan	96,3	89,7	108,5	118,7	23,2%
Armenia	99,3	96,0	107,3	105,7	6,5%
Iran	1,8	10,8	23,5	24,3	1221,9%
Israel	4,6	7,1	9,6	13,1	183,1%
Russia	63,6	70,8	94,6	117,1	84,1%
Turkey	89,5	82,4	83,9	91,5	2,3%
Ukraine	10,6	12,6	14,2	14,8	39,0%
European Union	17,8	19,1	23,6	32,1	80,4%
Other countries	17,6	25,1	37,1	43,3	146,0%
Total	438,0	449,4	540,2	600,3	37,1%

According to data from Georgia's National Tourism Administration, TASS reported that Armenia is third on the list of countries with the most visits from citizens in 2021. Turkey leads the pack in terms of trips made by visitors to Georgia last year, with 326 thousand, 2.7% fewer than in the previous year. With more than 212 thousand tourist visitors, 2.1% more than in 2020, Russia comes in second. Georgia received over 1.8 million international visits in total in 2021, an increase of 7.7% from the previous year.

=== Companies ===
In 2022, the sector with the highest number of companies registered in Georgia is Manufacturing with 3,905 companies, followed by Services and Wholesale Trade with 2,934 and 1,036 companies respectively.

== Infrastructure ==
=== Energy ===
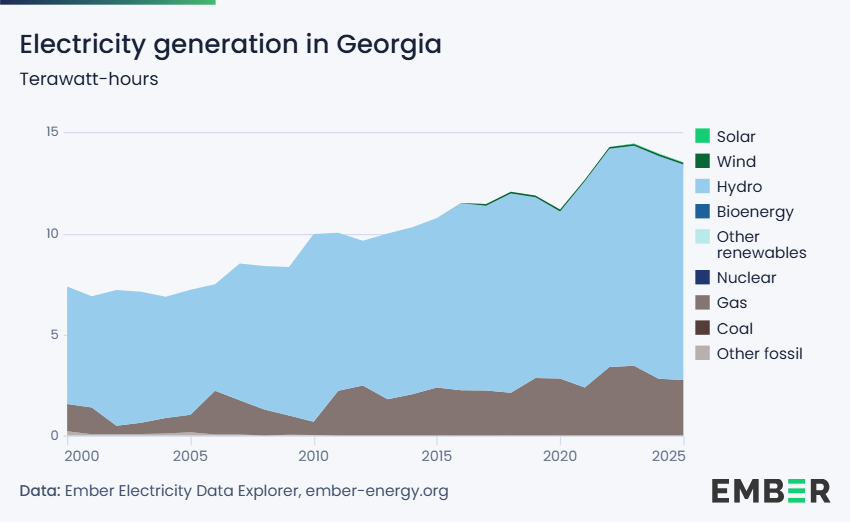
Electricity generation in Georgia in terawatt-hours

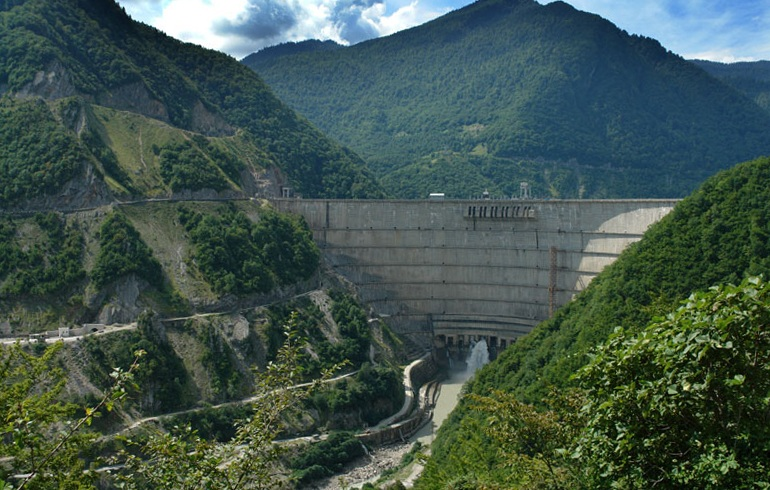
Enguri hydropower plant, completed in 1987

In recent years Georgia has fully deregulated its electricity sector, and now there is free and open access to the market.

Georgia has a sizable hydroelectric capacity, a factor that has become an increasingly important component of its energy supplies and policies. The country's topography and abundance of hydro resources give it serious potential to dominate hydroelectric markets in the Caucasus region. The Georgian Ministry of Energy estimates that there are around 26,000 rivers within Georgian territory, with approximately 300 of those rivers being significant in terms of energy production. The Ministry also claims that current projects for hydroelectric power plants total around US$2.4 billion. Alexander Khetaguri, the former Georgian Minister of Energy, proposed new hydroelectric projects worth well over 22,000 megawatts of capacity, which would cost over US$40 billion and would be privately funded. These projects alone would transform Georgia into the world's second-largest hydropower producer.

In 2007, Georgia generated 8.34 billion kilowatt-hours of electricity while consuming 8.15 billion kWh. Most of Georgia's electricity generation comes from hydroelectric facilities. In 2005, the country generated 6.17 billion kWh of hydropower, or 86% of total electricity generation.

In 2006, rapid growth in hydroelectricity output (by 27%) was matched by equally strong growth in thermal electricity (by 28%). Since then, the share of hydropower has grown even bigger, and the Inguri power plant has become the largest hydroelectric power plant in the South Caucasus region. In addition to state-owned Inguri, which has an installed capacity of 1,300 megawatts, Georgia's hydroelectric infrastructure consists of many small private plants.

In recent years, Georgia became a major exporter of electricity in the region, exporting 1.3 billion KWh in 2010. Hydropower stations of Georgia produce 80-85% of the electricity utilized within the country, the remaining 15–20% is produced by thermal power stations. According to Ministry of Energy and Natural Resources, so far, Georgia has been exploiting only 18% of its hydro resource potential.

Georgia's reliance on hydropower leaves the country vulnerable to climatic fluctuations, which requires imports to meet seasonal shortages, but also opens the possibility of exports during wetter conditions. Georgia still has the potential to increase hydro-generated power, through refurbishing existing facilities, as well as constructing new hydropower plants.

One of the more difficult realities facing many of the former Soviet republics was the loss of Soviet-subsidized fuel and utility transfers. Prior to 2004, Georgia's transmission network was in critical condition, with electricity blackouts being common throughout the country. In response to mounting pressures, the Georgian government initiated a series of legislative reforms in 1998 and 1999 to begin to develop the power sector and electricity markets. While measures were taken to unbundle and liberalize the energy sector, a new law was drafted and Georgia's independent regulatory authority, the Georgian National Energy Regulatory Commission (GNERC), was formed. In addition to providing government subsidies, the GNERC was able to increase the prices of electricity and natural gas in Georgia to buffer the costs of recovery from the state's reform process. Following these reforms, distribution has been increasingly more reliable, approaching consistent 24-hour-a-day services. Investments in infrastructure have been made as well. Currently, a privately owned Energo-Pro Georgia, controls 62.5% of the electricity distribution market.

Georgia has transmission lines that connect its power grid to Russia, Turkey, Armenia and Azerbaijan. In July 2008, Georgia began exporting electricity to Russia through the Kavkasioni power line, which had already been used earlier on to import electricity from Russia into Georgia. Later in 2009, Georgian Energy Minister Alexander Khetaguri incited scandal for a business deal struck with the Russian energy company, Inter RAO, to jointly manage the Georgian Inguri hydropower plant for 10 years. Khetaguri's proposal would entail a cash flow of around US$9 million into Georgia for use of the plant. Tensions ran high, however, as the Inguri hydropower plant provided nearly 40 to 50 percent of the country's electricity at the time and is located at the administrative border of the secessionist Abkhazia region.

Georgian natural gas consumption stood at 1.8 billion cubic meters in 2007. Natural gas used to be supplied to Georgia by Russia. In recent years, however, Georgia has been able to eliminate its dependency on imports from Russia, thanks to increased hydroelectricity production, and the availability of natural gas sources from Azerbaijan. In addition, all Russian gas exports to Armenia pass through the Georgian pipeline system. Georgia takes 10% of that gas as a transit fee.

Georgia is a partner country of the EU INOGATE energy programme, which has four key topics: enhancing energy security, convergence of member state energy markets on the basis of EU internal energy market principles, supporting sustainable energy development, and attracting investment for energy projects of common and regional interest.

Throughout the years, Turkey imported a significant amount of Georgian energy. However, as of September 2025, Georgia's electricity exports had fallen and were only flowing towards Azerbaijan (Turkey reduced its imports in response to falling demand), while imports were largely directed towards Russia and Azerbaijan.

=== Transport and logistics ===
Georgia is one of the key members in international TRACECA programme due to its important geographical and political location. Since it is situated right in between of Europe and Asia, the country is supposed to become a busy transitional hub of a modern Silk Road in the near future. On March 11 of 2015, Georgian media declared that the Chinese and Georgian companies have reached an agreement in Beijing concerning the developing of the deep-water port at Anaklia, which existence is crucial for the TRACECA route. The port will be constructed on a plot of over 1,000 hectares and have access to a deep sea canyon. US-Based SSA Marine was later finally chosen to Invest in and Operate Container Terminal of Anaklia Deep Sea Port in Georgia by signing an agreement with Anaklia Development Consortium on 1 August 2017.

First train containing 82 containers and 41 platforms came from China to Baku, Azerbaijan on July 28. It is planned to launch a first carriage using this way through Georgia to Istanbul in September 2015. Baku–Tbilisi–Kars railway became operational on October 30, 2017.

Re-exportation of vehicles which is one of the income sources for Georgia has lowered much during 2014–2015 stagnation, most noticeably to Azerbaijan: it became 5.1 times less (on 10 337 cars) comparing to the previous year.

=== Water supply and sanitation ===
Water supply and sanitation in Georgia is characterized by achievements and challenges. Among the achievements is the improvement of water services in the capital Tbilisi where the water supply is now continuous and of good quality, major improvements in the country's third-largest city Batumi on the Black Sea where the country's first modern wastewater treatment plant now is under operation, as well as a general increase in access to drinking water in the entire country. Water and sewer tariffs remain affordable, with the private water company Georgian Water and Power (GWP) serving the capital being financially viable and profitable, while the public water company serving most of the rest of the country remains financially weak. The improvements were achieved after the Rose Revolution of 2004 when the government decided to reform the sector and to invest in it after many years of neglect.

Among the remaining challenges are poor service quality in many areas outside the two largest cities, a declining access to improved sanitation in rural areas according to survey results, and insufficient treatment of wastewater.

== Trade ==
Georgia Countries with whom Georgia signed Free Trade Agreement (FTA) Countries with whom Georgia has General Schemes of Preference (GSP)

Exports of Georgia by product category (2019) Chemical products Transportation Machines Mineral products Plastics and rubbers Metals Foodstuffs Precious metals Textiles Instruments Animal products Vegetable products Paper goods Footwear and headwear Miscellaneous Stone and glass Wood products Animal and vegetable bi-products Animal hides Arts and antiques Weapons

Since 2014, Georgia is part of the European Union's Free Trade Area, with the EU continuing to be the country's largest trading partner, accounting for over a quarter of Georgia's total trade turnover. Following the EU trade pact, 2015 was marked by further increase in bilateral trade, whereas trade with the Russian-led Commonwealth of Independent States (CIS) decreased by 22%.

In 2023, Georgia signed comprehensive economic agreement with UAE, under which two countries established free trade.

As of 2015, in the order of magnitude, Georgia's main exports were: copper ores and concentrates, ferroalloys, hazelnut, medications, nitrogen fertilizers, wine, crude oil, mineral water, non-denatured ethanol and spirits.

In 2015, Georgia's main imports, in the order of magnitude, were: oil products, vehicles, hydrocarbons, copper ores and concentrates, mobile phones and other wireless phones, wheat, cigarettes, iron tubes and pipes, structures and parts of structures of iron.

In 2019, Georgian exports to Armenia grew by 2% compared to the previous year, while imports decreased by 7%. Georgia exported 98.3 million $ worth of products to Armenia (4% of total exports), and imported 46.9 million $ (1% of total imports) in 2019.

Trade statistics
Year	2000	2005	2010	2015	2016	2017	2018	2019	2020	2021	2022	2023
Exports, billion US$	0.5	1.4	2.4	3.0	2.9	3.6	4.4	5.0	4.4	5.5	7.5	8.1
Imports, billion US$	1.0	2.6	5.0	7.0	6.8	7.4	8.5	8.7	7.5	9.3	12.6	14.2
Net trade, billion US$	−0.5	−1.2	−2.6	−4.0	−3.9	−3.8	−4.1	−3.8	−3.1	−3.8	−5.1	−6.1

== Foreign direct investment in Georgia ==
Large inflows of Foreign direct investment (FDI) have been a driving factor behind a rapid economic growth in Georgia since 2003.

Georgia houses a liberal investment environment and equal approach to local and foreign investors, supporting for FDI.

Georgia's business environment is defined by liberal and free market oriented economic policy, only 6 taxes, reduced tax rates, reduced numbers of licenses and permissions, simplified administrative procedures, preferential trade regimes with foreign countries, advantageous geographic location, developed, integrated and multimodal transport infrastructure, an educated and skilled workforce. In addition to other features, Georgia has Free Industrial Zones, where companies are exempt from all the corporate taxes.

From 2003 to 2011, FDI in Georgia amounted to US$8511.5 million. The highest volume of FDI – 2,015.0 million USD was reached in 2007, with 69.3% yearly growth. High rate of investment was maintained until 2008. In 2007, the EC27 accounted for over 56% of FDI inflows and in 2008 the EC, UAE, and Turkey accounted for nearly 60%. In 2009, FDI inflows were characterized by decreasing trend. The main reasons of decreasing were external shocks, the 2008 South Ossetia war and the 2008 financial crisis.

In the first half of 2017, Armenian Investments to Georgia nearly doubled year-on-year to $5.6 million, while investments from Azerbaijan dropped by 20.3% year-on-year to the overall $224.18 million.

• In 2009–2011 the largest share of FDI felt on Industry sector (31.2) amounted to US$765 million, real estate sector (15.8%) amounting to US$389 million.

The table below shows FDI stock as a percentage of GDP in selected FSU countries. For statistical purposes, FDI is defined as a foreign company owning 10% or more of the ordinary shares of an incorporated firm or its equivalent for an unincorporated firm.

Rank	Country	FDI stock as a percentage of GDP (2010)
1	Estonia	85,6
2	Georgia	67,1
3	Kazakhstan	61,1
4	Ukraine	42,5
5	Russian Federation	28,7
6	Armenia	18,5
7	Belarus	18,3

Foreign direct investment in the country of Georgia by year.

Year	Amount (mln USD)
2000	131.2
2001	109.8
2002	167.3
2003	340
2004	499.1
2005	449.7
2006	1100
2007	2010
2008	1500
2009	658.4
2010	814
2011	1111
2012	865
2013	914
2014	1750
2015	1564
2016	1565.9
2017	751 (January–June)

== International money transfers ==
Money transferred from abroad to Georgia in 2019 amounted to US$1.73 billion, according to figures released by Georgia's central bank. Money transfers from Russia, which has been the largest source of remittances for Georgia for many years already, stood at US$428.89 million in 2019.

Among other largest sources of remittances for Georgia are: Greece with US$192.56 million in 2019, Italy – USD 239.17 million; the United States – USD 178.41 million; Ukraine – USD 47.3 million; Spain – USD 30.9 million; Turkey – USD 94.85 million; Kazakhstan – USD 26.63 million; the UK – USD 16.89 million; Israel – USD 162.55 million; Azerbaijan – USD 22.17 million; Germany – USD 49.81 million; France – USD 26.37 million; Canada – USD 14.21 million.

== Institutional reforms ==
Under the Saakashvili administration, Georgia undertook a number of profound institutional reforms aimed at modernizing the economy and improving the business climate. Kakha Bendukidze (1956–2014) was one of the most notable team members during his governance, coordinating the Ministry of Economical Reforms of Georgia. Implemented institutional reforms created an effective, professional and transparent public sector, motivated to protect the principles of democracy. Due to the economic deregulation policy, number of state regulated spheres sharply decreased, as well as regulation procedures were simplified.

Georgia succeeded in fighting against corruption, that was one of the main obstacles for development. The success of Georgia is recognized by different rating agencies. According to the Transparency International, Georgia is the top country in the post-Soviet region in terms of fighting corruption. According to the Corruption Perception Index published by Transparency International, Georgia ranked 50th in 2014 (up from 113th in 2004). "Global Corruption Barometer 2010" ranks Georgia the first among world countries in the term of decreasing corruption level. According to International Finance Corporation Business Perception Survey 2012, only 0.11% of surveyed (1 respondent out of 920) named corruption as a problem in relations with public organizations.

Georgia has the most liberal tax jurisdiction in Europe. The number of taxes is decreased from 21 to only 6, tax rates were reduced also. In addition, significant procedural and institutional reforms were implemented – simplified system of tax disputes was established, tax administration system was streamlined and most of the taxes currently are paid on-line.

Due to the customs reform, customs procedures were dramatically simplified. Customs tariffs reform significantly simplified and sharply reduced the costs connected to the foreign trade. The number of import tariffs was abolished on approximately 90% of products and only 3 tariff rates exist instead of the previous 16. Currently, 86% of tariff lines are duty-free compared to 26% in 2005. Modern Customs Clearance Zones were established and customs clearness procedures could be made starting from 15 minutes only.

Modernization of the system of licenses and permits resulted in decrease in the number of licenses and permits and simplification of related administrative procedures.

Privatization of state property – Starting from 2004, provision of a transparent privatization policy was one of the important reforms of the Government of Georgia, that was addressed to denationalization of the remained state property in order to attract foreign investments, increase and develop the private sector and effective use of country's resources.

Liberal labour legislation simplified the relations between employers and employees. As a result of the reform, ”Heritage Foundation” and other analytical centers named Georgian Labour Code as one of the most liberal in the world because it significantly reduced hiring and firing expenses.

Georgia offers the most simplified procedures for registration of business, property, for getting different documentations via “One-Stop-Shops”, where the most procedures could be done on-line. Doing Business 2012 report (WB) places Georgia 16th in terms of Ease of Doing Business index (up from 112 in 2006), naming Georgia as the top reformer amongst the 174 countries over the last 5 years. Georgia is amongst the leaders in other ratings, namely, registering property – first place; Dealing Construction Permits – 4th place, starting a Business – 7th place; Getting Credits – 8th place.

=== Licensing regulation ===
Due to the reform of the system of licenses and permits, the number of licenses and permits was reduced by 90%. Currently, licenses and permits are only used in the production of highly risky goods and services; also usage of natural resources and specific activities. The procedures of issuing licenses and permits were significantly simplified, the “One-Stop Shop” and “Silence is Consent” principles were introduced which implies that if a person is not notified with argumentation rejection about the issuance of license in limited framework, the license is considered as issued from the relevant body.

The procedures for getting a construction permit was dramatically simplified, and it requires just 3 procedures. The time for getting the construction permits was sharply reduced. According to Doing Business 2012 (WB) Georgia is the best performer in the Eastern Europe and Central Asia (ECA) region and places on 4-th position in the world. The number of procedures and days, the cost (% of income per capita) is much lower, than in ECA region and OECD countries.

Things have changed after the new Law on Issuance of Licenses and permits was introduced in 2005. The approval process for building a warehouse in Georgia is now more efficient than in all EU countries except Denmark.

=== Tax collection ===
Since January, 2011 the new Tax Code came into force. It unifies the old Tax and Customs Codes. The new Tax Code increased confidence towards the Georgian tax system and enhanced trust in the Georgian tax authorities, by improving communication between taxpayers and the tax authorities, by protecting the taxpayers’ rights, by making administration more efficient, and by harmonizing the Georgian laws with the best international tax practices and EU directives.

Only 6 taxes exist in Georgia with law tax rates: Income Tax (personal income tax) 20%; Profit Tax (corporate tax) – 15%; Value Added Tax – 18%; Excise – varies; Property Tax up to 1% of the self-assessed value of property; Customs Tax – 0%; 5%; 12%. In addition, significant procedural and institutional reforms were performed, simplified tax dispute settlement, streamlined tax administration decreased the time and cost of paying taxes. Georgia made paying taxes easier for firms by simplifying the reporting for value added tax and introducing electronic filling and payment of taxes.

The number of import tariffs was abolished on approximately 90% of products and only 3 tariff rates (0%, 5%, 12%) exist instead of the previous 16. Georgia sets Import Taxes on only several kinds of agricultural and manufactured goods . In addition, there are no quantitative restrictions (quotas) on imports and exports.

=== Labour regulation ===
With unemployment around 16% and many jobs in the informal sector, Georgia undertook a far-reaching reform of labour regulation. The new Labour Code was adopted on 17 December 2010. The new law eases restrictions on the duration of term contracts and the number of overtime hours, and discards the premium required for overtime work. It also eliminates the requirement to notify and get permission from the labour union to fire a redundant worker. The new law provides for 1 month's severance pay at least, replacing complex rules under which required notice periods depended on seniority and the manager had to write long explanations to labor unions and the relevant ministry. In general, new regulations make the Georgian labor market much more flexible.

Coupled with the fact that Georgia also reduced the social security contributions paid on wages by businesses from 31% to 20% in 2005, and abolished them entirely starting January 2008, these changes make Georgia the sixth-easiest place to employ workers globally.

=== Judicial procedure ===
Reducing corruption in the courts was one of the chief priorities of the new government. Since 2004, when the Saakashvili administration came in, seven judges have been detained for taking bribes and 15 brought before the criminal courts. In 2005 alone, the judicial disciplinary council reviewed cases against 99 judges, about 40% of the judiciary, and 12 judges were dismissed. At the same time, judges’ salaries were increased fourfold, to reduce dependence on bribe money.

According to Global Property Guide index, Georgia currently holds 40 points out of 100. That stands for "The court system is highly inefficient, and delays are so long that they deter the use of the court system. Corruption is present, and the judiciary is influenced by other branches of government. Expropriation is possible."

== Unemployment ==
Unemployment has been a persistent problem in Georgia ever since the country gained independence in 1991. According to the National Statistics Office, unemployment rate stood at 16.9% in 2013 and has decreased to 13.9% in 2024.

Nearly a half of Georgia's population lives in rural areas, where low-intensity self-sufficient farming provides the principal source of livelihood. Georgian statistics service puts individual persons into the category of self-employed workers. As of 2007 416,900 persons were listed as self-employed in agriculture. For large families, heads of households are typically described as "individual entrepreneurs", members of the family that help to cultivate land are classified as "unpaid family business workers". The use of this methodology produces relatively low unemployment rates for rural areas rather in urban areas and in Tbilisi. Neighbouring countries show somewhat similar results. For example, Armenia in 2015 had 18.26% unemployment rate, which is 532.644 people.

	2014	2015	2016	2017	2018	2019	2020
Active population (labour force), thousand persons	1 629	1 675.6	1 653.8	1 641.4	1 605.2	1 572.8	1 523.7
Employed, thousand persons	1 255	1 308.5	1 294.5	1 286.9	1 296.2	1 295.9	1 241.8
Unemployed, thousand persons	374	367.2	359.2	354.5	309.0	276.9	281.9
Unemployment rate, percentage	23.0	21.9	21.7	21.6	19.2	17.6	18.5

== Human Development Index of Georgia ==
Human Development Index is a composite statistic of life expectancy, education, and income indices used to rank countries into four tiers of human development. Georgia's HDI value for 2017 is 0.780— in the high human development category—positioning it at 70 out of 189 countries and territories. The rank is shared with Antigua and Barbuda. Between 2000 and 2017, Georgia's HDI value increased from 0.673 to 0.780, an increase of 15.9 percent or average annual increase of about 0.9 percent. Between 1990 and 2017, Georgia's life expectancy at birth increased by 3.1 years, mean years of schooling increased by 1.1 years and expected years of schooling increased by 2.6 years, also Georgia's GNI per capita increased by about 21.0%. However, it is misleading to compare values and rankings with those of previously published reports, because the underlying data and methods have changed over time.

Year	Life expectancy at birth	Expected years of schooling	Mean years of schooling	GNI per capita (2011 PPP$)	HDI value
1990	70.3	12.4	N/A	7589	N/A
1995	70.5	10.9	N/A	2273	N/A
2000	71.9	11.7	11.7	3404	0.673
2005	72.7	12.6	12.1	4983	0.712
2010	72.6	13.3	12.2	6517	0.735
2015	73.1	14.7	12.7	8766	0.771
2016	73.3	15.0	12.8	8785	0.776
2017	73.4	15.0	12.8	9186	0.780

== See also ==
- List of Georgian companies
- List of Georgian people by net worth
- List of Georgian regions by GDP
- Economy of Abkhazia
- Corruption in Georgia
- Chamber of Commerce and Industry of the Republic of Abkhazia
- Ministry of Economy and Sustainable Development (Georgia)
- Ministry of Finance of Georgia
- National Bank of Georgia
- Kulevi Oil Terminal
