= List of countries by average wage =

The average wage is a measure of total income divided by total number of employees employed. In this article, the average wage is adjusted for living expenses "purchasing power parity" (PPP). This is not to be confused with the average income which is a measure of total income including wage, investment benefit, and other capital gains divided by total number of people in the population including non-working residents. Average wages can differ from median income; for example, the Social Security Administration estimated that the 2023 average net wage in the United States was $63,932, while the 2023 median net wage was $43,222.

== OECD statistics ==
The OECD (Organization for Economic Co-operation and Development) dataset contains data on average annual wages for full-time and full-year equivalent employees in the total economy. Average annual wages per full-time equivalent dependent employee are obtained by dividing the national-accounts-based total wage bill by the average number of employees in the total economy, which is then multiplied by the ratio of average usual weekly hours per full-time employee to average usually weekly hours for all employees.

* Indicates "Economy of [country or territory]" links.

Development of average annual wages 2000–2025 (Constant Prices USD PPP 2025)
Country	2025	2020	2010	2000
Luxembourg *	98,530	90,997	86,178	77,473
Switzerland *	92,285	86,151	83,217	74,867
United States *	86,977	85,171	73,515	66,815
Netherlands *	80,136	81,772	81,996	75,116
Belgium *	80,009	75,471	74,389	71,615
Iceland *	—N/a	66,219	53,737	59,813
Austria *	78,301	75,824	73,745	67,705
Denmark *	78,090	76,857	70,244	60,085
Germany *	76,285	74,807	65,869	64,046
Norway *	73,462	69,332	60,442	46,455
Australia *	72,018	73,067	67,657	58,709
Ireland *	70,113	72,134	68,116	48,117
Canada *	67,901	68,086	61,127	54,216
United Kingdom *	66,299	65,541	64,482	55,158
Slovenia *	63,376	56,492	49,626	38,068
Finland *	63,053	63,100	61,132	52,219
Sweden *	61,443	62,495	55,267	45,863
South Korea *	61,259	59,419	49,550	40,011
New Zealand *	60,896	59,357	51,226	41,986
France *	60,483	58,327	57,667	50,339
Lithuania *	58,112	50,123	31,213	18,828
Spain *	57,779	55,380	58,022	53,409
Israel *	57,426	54,274	49,118	52,106
Turkey *	—N/a	35,920	25,544	24,979
Italy *	53,864	52,901	57,790	55,459
Japan *	50,183	51,294	51,438	51,891
Poland *	49,074	42,179	32,758	27,946
Portugal *	44,937	39,461	39,084	38,604
Latvia *	44,709	39,810	25,601	15,300
Costa Rica *	—N/a	46,398	31,315	26,949
Czech Republic *	43,607	42,330	33,932	24,204
Estonia *	41,019	40,390	28,995	16,870
Chile *	—N/a	39 081	40 296	25 514
Hungary *	39,145	32,961	27,273	20,304
Slovakia *	37,832	36,846	30,353	22,206
Greece *	32,412	32,517	41,643	32,710
Colombia *	—N/a	35,659	28,087	—N/a
Mexico *	24,463	22,465	21,523	23,912

== UNECE statistics ==
World map of average monthly wage per UNECE statistics: ≥ $7,000; $6,000–$7,000; $5,000–$6,000; $4,000–$5,000; $3,000–$4,000; $2,000–$3,000; $1,500–$2,000; $1,250–$1,500; $1,000–$1,250; $750–$1,000; $500–$750; $250–$500; < $250; Data unavailable

The gross average monthly wage estimates for 2023 are computed by converting national currency figures from the United Nations Economic Commission for Europe (UNECE) Statistical Database, compiled from national and international (the CIS, Eurostat, the OECD) official sources. Wages in U.S. dollars are computed by the UNECE Secretariat using purchasing-power-parity dollars.

Gross average monthly wages cover total wages and salaries in cash and in kind, before any tax deduction and before social security contributions. They include wages and salaries, remuneration for time not worked, bonuses and gratuities paid by the employer to the employee. Wages cover the total economy and are expressed per full-time equivalent employee.

* Indicates "Economy of [country or territory]" links.

List of countries by gross average monthly wages (USD, at current exchange rates)
Country	Gross Average Monthly Wage	Year
Switzerland *	9,166	2024
Luxembourg *	7,536	2024
Iceland *	7,132	2024
United States *	6,911	2024
Denmark *	6,361	2024
Norway *	5,578	2024
Belgium *	5,327	2024
Netherlands *	5,251	2024
Austria *	5,136	2024
Canada *	5,057	2024
Ireland *	5,012	2024
United Kingdom *	4,772	2024
Germany *	4,531	2024
Finland *	4,419	2024
Sweden *	4,177	2024
France *	4,049	2024
Israel *	3,637	2024
Slovenia *	3,347	2024
Italy *	2,988	2024
Spain *	2,979	2024
Andorra *	2,781	2024
Cyprus *	2,690	2024
Lithuania *	2,592	2024
Estonia *	2,143	2024
Malta *	2,117	2024
Portugal *	2,089	2024
Czech Republic *	2,044	2024
Croatia *	1,970	2024
Poland *	1,918	2024
Romania *	1,850	2024
Slovakia *	1,837	2024
Latvia *	1,823	2024
Greece *	1,665	2024
Hungary *	1,545	2024
Turkey *	1,362	2023
Bulgaria *	1,285	2024
Serbia *	1,251	2024
Bosnia and Herzegovina *	1,183	2024
Montenegro *	1,172	2024
North Macedonia *	1,090	2024
Russia *	936	2013
Kazakhstan *	865	2024
Albania *	832	2024
Moldova *	783	2024
Georgia *	757	2024
Armenia *	731	2024
Belarus *	700	2024
Azerbaijan *	549	2023
Ukraine *	535	2024
Kyrgyzstan *	491	2025
Turkmenistan *	401	2017
Uzbekistan *	348	2024
Tajikistan *	214	2024

== See also ==
- Disposable household and per capita income
- List of American countries by average wage
- List of Asian countries by average wage
- List of ASEAN countries and subdivisions by minimum wage
- List of countries by GDP (nominal) per capita
- List of countries by GDP (PPP) per capita
- List of countries by GNI per capita growth
- List of countries by labour productivity
- List of countries by minimum wage
- List of countries by wealth per adult
- List of European countries by average wage
- Personal income in the United States
