= Economy of Georgia =

Economy of Georgia may refer to:

- Economy of Georgia (country)
- Economy of Georgia (U.S. state)
