= List of American countries by monthly average wage =

This is the map and list of American countries by monthly net (after taxes) average wage. The chart below reflects the average (mean) wage as reported by various data providers. The salary distribution is right-skewed, therefore more than 50% of people earn less than the average net salary. These figures have been shrunk after the application of the income tax. In certain countries, actual incomes may exceed those listed in the table due to the existence of grey economies. In some countries, social security, contributions for pensions, public schools, and health are included in these taxes.

== Map ==
=== Nominal ===
The countries and territories have a ´´´net average monthly salary at market prices´´´ of:

Purple	above $2,000
Blue	$1,000 to $1,999
Green	$500 to $999
Yellow	below $500

== Northern America ==
State	Gross (Local Currency)	Net (Local Currency)	Net (US$)
Canada	CAD 6,639	CAD 4,712	$3,300
Greenland			$4,332
United States	USD 6,779	USD 5,359	$5,359

== Latin America ==
State	Net (Local Currency)	Net (US$)
Argentina	ARS 1,082,635	$734
(The Bahamas) Bahamas		$2,595
Belize	BZD 1,551	$772
Bolivia		$397
Brazil	BRL 3,367	$658
Chile	CLP 962,945	$1,041
Colombia		$345
Costa Rica	CRC 542,721	$1,195
Cuba	CUP 6,930	$58
Dominica		$432
Dominican Republic	DOP 28,480	$468 (Note: Net income is about 89% of gross income.)
Ecuador	USD 430	$430
El Salvador	USD 435	$435
Guatemala	GTQ 2,797	$376
Guyana		$1,038
Honduras		$537
Jamaica	JMD 128,000	$815 (Note: Net income is about 80% of gross income.) (Note: Figure does not include income of informal workers. Large informal economy means many workers earn below the official minimum wage in practice.)
Mexico	MXN 11,535	$664
Nicaragua	NIO 11,263	
Panama	PAB 756	$756
Paraguay	PYG 3,200,000	$523
Peru	PEN 1,887	$557
Puerto Rico		$2,724
Suriname	SRD 10,348	
Uruguay	UYU 54,680	$1,360
Venezuela		$213

== See also ==
- List of countries by average wage
- List of European countries by average wage
- List of Asian countries by average wage
- List of Oceanian countries by average wage
- List of countries by GDP (nominal) per capita
- List of countries by GDP (PPP) per capita
- List of countries by GDP (nominal)
- List of countries by GDP (PPP)
