= List of Georgian people by net worth =

This is a list of Georgian billionaires based on an annual assessment of wealth and assets compiled and published by Forbes magazine in 2023.

== 2023 Georgian billionaires list ==
World Rank	Name	Citizenship	Net worth (USD)	Source of wealth
552	Bidzina Ivanishvili	Georgia; France	4.9 billion	investments
766	Mikheil Lomtadze	Georgia	3.7 billion	fintech

== See also ==
- The World's Billionaires
- List of countries by the number of billionaires
