= Water supply and sanitation in Georgia =

Data
- Access to an improved water source: 100% (2015)
- Access to improved sanitation: 86% (2015)
- Continuity of supply: Continuous in Tbilisi, intermittent in many other cities and towns
- Average urban water use (L/person/day): 800 in Tbilisi (2013), much lower in many other towns
- Average urban water and sanitation tariff (US$/m^{3}): 0.15 (2014) in Tbilisi; 0.22 (2016) outside Tbilisi
- Share of household metering: 22% in Tbilisi

Institutions
- Decentralization to municipalities: No
- Water and sanitation regulator: National Energy and Water Regulatory Commission
- Responsibility for policy setting: State Commission on Water Supply and Energy

Water supply and sanitation in Georgia is characterized by achievements and challenges. Among the achievements is the improvement of water services in the capital Tbilisi where the water supply is now continuous and of good quality, major improvements in the country's third-largest city Batumi on the Black Sea where the country's first modern wastewater treatment plant now is under operation, as well as a general increase in access to drinking water in the entire country. Water and sewer tariffs remain affordable, with the private water company Georgian Water and Power (GWP) serving the capital being financially viable and profitable, while the public water company serving most of the rest of the country remains financially weak. The improvements were achieved after the Rose Revolution of 2004 when the government decided to reform the sector and to invest in it after many years of neglect.

Among the remaining challenges are poor service quality in many areas outside the two largest cities, a declining access to improved sanitation in rural areas according to survey results, and insufficient treatment of wastewater.

== History ==
When the Soviet Union collapsed and Georgia became independent in 1991, its water supply and sanitation infrastructure was in bad shape. Maintenance had been neglected for many years and service quality was poor, with intermittent supply and often poor drinking water quality. After independence there was no clear government commitment to address the deficiencies in water supply and sanitation and service quality deteriorated even further. For example, operation of the wastewater treatment plant of the capital Tbilisi was stopped because the city was unable to afford to pay for its electricity bill after electricity tariffs had been increased. In 2003 a report by the OECD found that the Georgian urban water and sanitation sector was seriously under-financed, given its long neglect. The report noted that the collection rate of water bills was 70% for businesses and only 34% for households. The report recommended increasing collection efficiency and to double the water and sewer tariff in areas outside the capital until they reached the highest affordable level. This was defined as 95% of households spending less than 2.5% of their income on their water and sewer bill. The OECD recommended to leave the tariff in Tbilisi unchanged, because it had already reached the limit of affordability. Furthermore, the government should increase its spending for water supply and sanitation, reform the sector's structure and strengthen human and institutional capacities.

After the Rose Revolution of 2003 a new government began to seriously address the issues in the sector. As a first step, the government took away the responsibility for water supply and sanitation from local governments and, for the areas outside the capital, transferred it to two state-owned Limited Liability Companies, Western Water and Eastern Water. In 2010 they were merged into one company, the United Water Supply Company of Georgia (UWSCG). Investments to improve the infrastructure in the services area of UWSCG were financed primarily by foreign donors through loans and grants implemented by the Municipal Development Fund of Georgia, while UWSCG is in charge of operating the water and sewer systems.

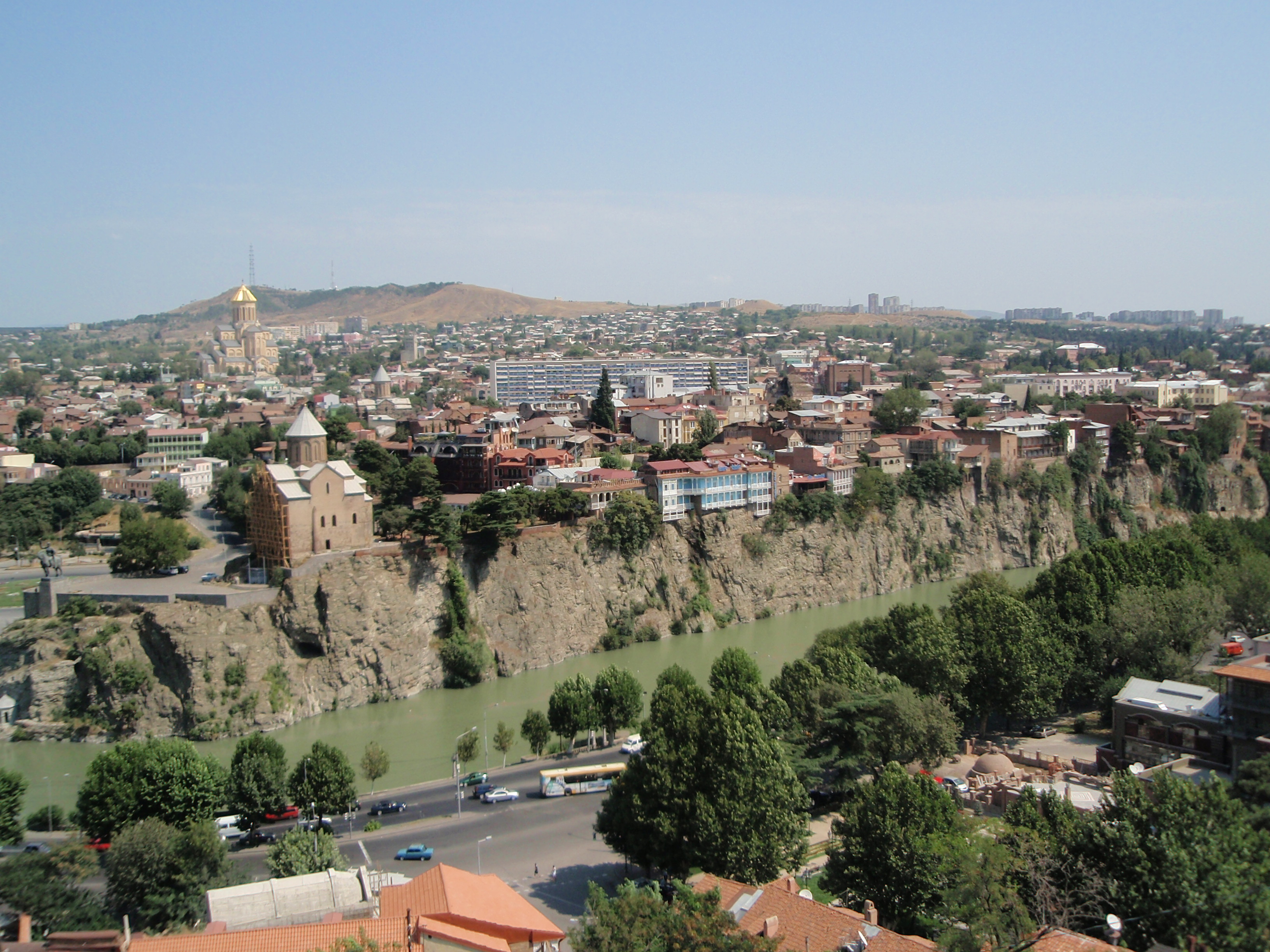
View of Tbilisi, the capital of Georgia.

A second step was the privatization of the Tbilisi Water Supply Company. In 2006, a credit of 25 million USD had been approved by the European Bank for Reconstruction and Development (EBRD) to rehabilitate the water and sanitation infrastructure of Tbilisi. But the government refused the loan and instead opted for full privatization. In November 2007 it decided to sell the company to Multiplex Energy Limited, a newly created company whose ownership was not known to the public. The new company was obliged to keep tariffs unchanged for the next five years and to make substantial improvements, including the rehabilitation of the sewer infrastructure by 2012, 24-hour water supply within the entire service area by 2015 and the construction of a new wastewater treatment plant at Gardabani to replace the dilapidated existing plant by 2018. The private company took over its responsibilities in May 2008. A performance incentive system for employees and a new billing system were introduced, and connections were gradually retrofitted with meters reaching 23% of customers in 2013. According to an independent study, the overall results of water privatization in Tbilisi were positive. While staffing levels did gradually decrease from 1,962 full-time equivalents in 2006 to 1,606 in 2012, training and overall job satisfaction all increased. The average income of employees doubled between 2006 and 2013. This was more than the inflation rate during the same period, but increases were not as high as the average for water and power companies in Georgia. Furthermore, physical water losses and water theft (non-revenue water) decreased slightly (from 42% in 2006 to 38% in 2013) and water supply became continuous within the old administrative borders of Tbilisi in 2013.

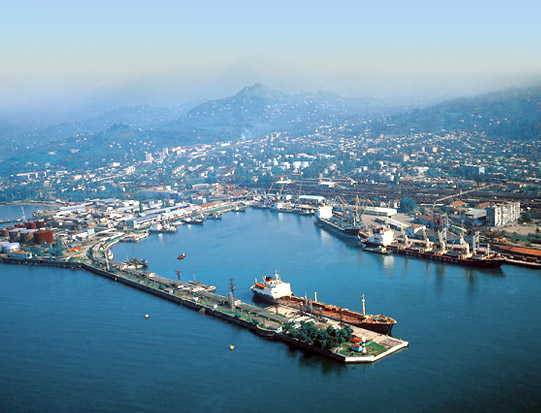
View of Batumi the second-largest city of Georgia.

The government also wanted to include Autonomous Republic of Adjara in the service area of UWSCG in 2010. However, this was opposed by the German state-owned development bank KfW that provided substantial funding for water supply and sanitation in Batumi on behalf of the German government. Adjara was thus excluded. In 2014 the government made a second attempt to included Adjara in the service area of the United Water Company through a decree issued by the Prime Minister, but this attempt was also foiled. De jure water and wastewater management in Adjara remains decentralized, but actually the government in Tbilisi is involved in all important decisions so that de facto it is as centralized as in other regions of Georgia. On the one hand, the Batumi water company remains financially weak, with non-revenue water as high as 90%, significant amounts of unpaid bills. As a result, tariff revenues were only 0.7 million Laris (USD 0.4m) in 2014, while operating costs stood at 10 million Laris (USD 5.7m), of which 45% were for salaries, according to an audit by the state auditor. On the other hand, there have been many notable improvements in service quality in Batumi. For example, a separate stormwater drainage system has been built, preventing flooding that had previously been frequent. 70% of customers now receive water 24 hours a day, and a modern wastewater treatment plant has been commissioned in 2012. The plant functions properly, so that the quality of coastal waters has improved substantially, benefiting tourism and making it possible to eat again locally caught fish. Both the investments costs and the energy consumption of the trickling filter plant are extremely low, for which the Austrian engineering company working on the plant was honored with an innovation award by the International Water Association (IWA), a professional association.

== Water resources ==
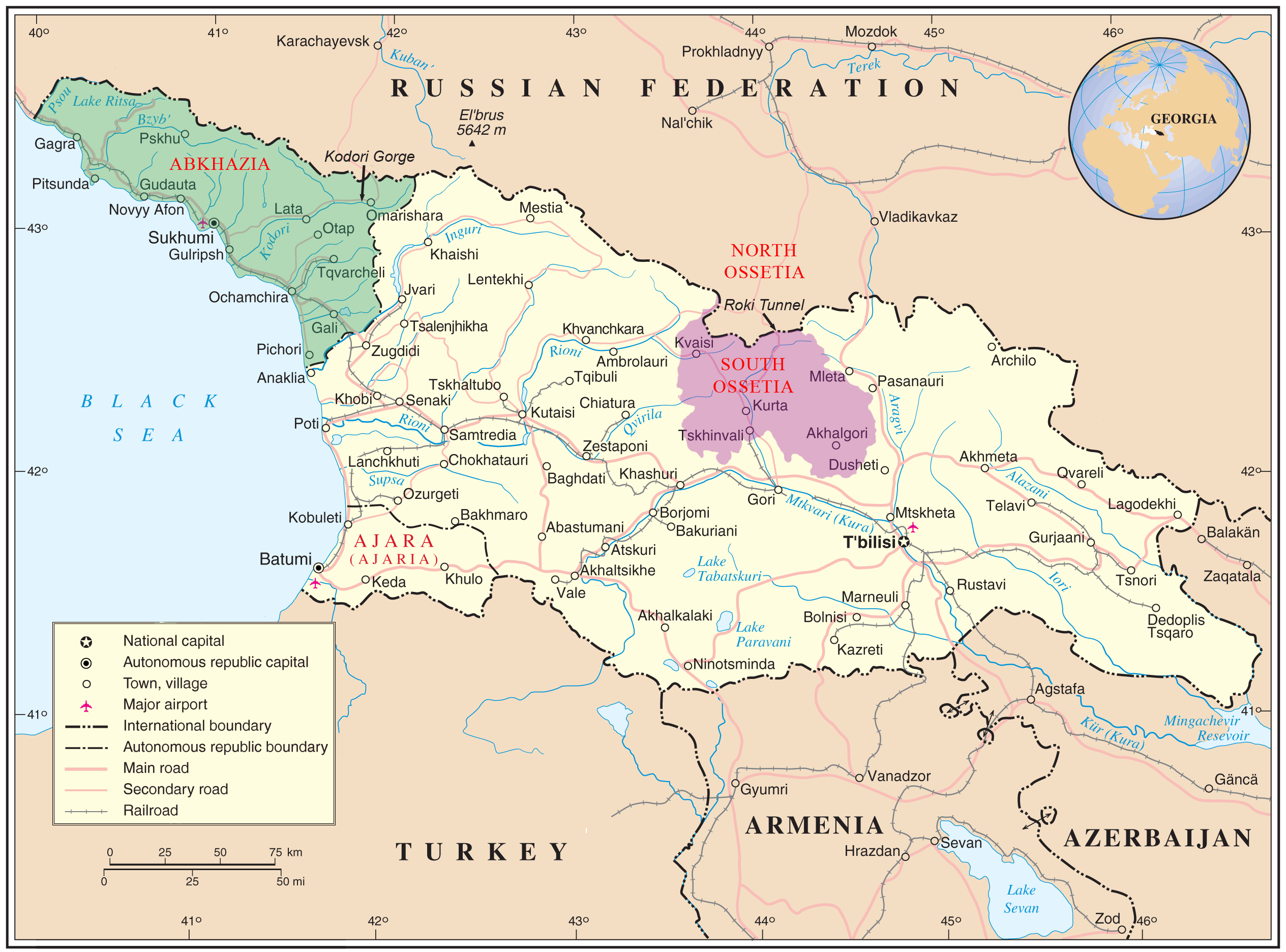
Map of Georgia.

Georgia has abundant water resources. Among the total water resources of 63 billion m^{3}/year (long-term average) only 1.6 billion m^{3}/year or about 2% are being abstracted. About two thirds of the abstracted water is used for irrigated agriculture, and the other third for municipal and industrial uses. Despite the abundance of water resources, the Eastern part of Georgia is relatively dry and is regularly affected by droughts. The country's major river, the Kura River, rises in Turkey and receives half of its flow from snowmelt and glaciers. The river, which flows from Georgia to Azerbaijan, is increasingly polluted downstream of Tbilisi.

== Access and water use ==
Access to water supply and sanitation in Georgia is high. Based on household surveys and census results, the Joint Monitoring Programme for Water Supply and Sanitation estimates that access to an improved water source was universal in 2015. Access to improved sanitation stood at 86% (95% in urban areas, 76% in rural areas). According to these estimates based on census and household survey data access to water improved from 96% in 1990 to 100% in 2010, while access to sanitation declined from 98% in 1990 to 86% in 2015. The decline in access to sanitation was most marked in rural areas, where it declined from 96% estimated during a survey in 1996 to 79% estimated through a survey in 2013. The definition of improved sanitation includes pit latrines with slabs, while it excludes pit latrines without slabs. It is often difficult for surveyors conducting general household surveys to get reliable responses to the question that refers to the exact type of latrine in a house, so that the above access numbers should be treated with some caution.

Per capita water use in Georgia varies greatly between localities. In 2003 it varied between 743 liters/capita/day in Tbilisi and only 31 liters in Zugdidi, a small town in Western Georgia. This compares to 100 - 150 liters in Central Europe. Consumption was estimated at 94 liters in Rustavi, 116 liters in Kutaisi and 432 liters in Batumi. The mean time of supply per day was estimated at 12 hours, with the lowest value being 3 hours in the small town of Gurjaani in Eastern Georgia. In many towns water was not disinfected at all or only seasonally.

== Infrastructure ==
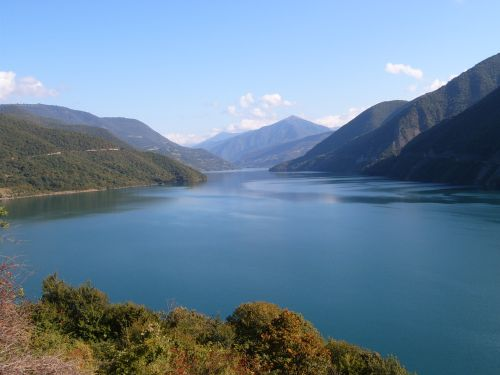
The Zhinvali reservoir is a major source of drinking water for the capital Tbilisi.

Tbilisi obtains most of its drinking water from the basin of the Aragvi River north of the city. Groundwater (60% of the total) is pumped from well fields, while surface water (40%) is mostly obtained from the reservoir of the Zhinvali Dam 42 km from the city. The water is treated in two plants: the Samgori plant built in the 1950s and the Grmagele plant, located at the Zhinvali Dam, built in the 1980s. The length of the water distribution network in Tbilisi is 3,600 km. About 35% of the main network is made of iron pipes and 65% of steel pipes. Polyethylene pipes have been installed only recently. There are 84 reservoirs and 169 pumps. The sewer network consists of 1,600 km of pipes made of ceramic, reinforced concrete, cast iron, asbestos cement and polyethylene. The wastewater is transferred by trunk sewer with a length of 72 km to the Gardabani waste water treatment plant commissioned in 1979 with a capacity of 1 million m^{3}/day. The biological treatment at the plant is not in operation due to its high energy consumption and the associated high cost. The untreated wastewater is discharged into the Kura River.

== Service quality ==
=== Drinking water quality ===
Tbilisi is provided with an up-to-date high-quality water supply service ensuring delivery of good quality drinking water without significant interruptions 24 hours a day. However, outside the capital the quality of drinking water often fails to meet state standards. It sometimes contains sediments and has inappropriate smell and color. Furthermore, as of 2008 about 30% of the population outside Tbilisi received water for less than 12 hours per day, and many people living on upper floors did not receive water at all due to low pressure.

=== Wastewater treatment ===
70% of the population is connected to sewers. However, as of 2010 all wastewater treatment plants established during the Soviet period were out of order or provided only primary treatment. As a result, untreated municipal wastewater is a major polluter of surface waters.

== Legal and institutional framework ==
According to a 2015 study, Georgia’s water-related legislation is inconsistent, contradictory and fragmented. For example, the 2006 Organic Law on Self-Governance gives the exclusive right to provide water and sanitation services to local governments, but de facto local governments play no role in the sector except for Adjara. According to the study, there is a strong need for reform of the current water legislation and the current system of water resources management. The first step should be the adoption of a law on water resources management to replace the Water Law of 1997, which covers only surface water but not groundwater and which does not foresee permits for water abstraction. As of 2013 an inter-ministerial working group supported by the United Nations Economic Commission for Europe was working on the draft of a new water law that would be consistent with the principles of integrated water resources management and the EU Water Framework Directive. In particular, the law would introduce permits for water use and discharge. It would also clarify the role of different government agencies involved in the sector.

=== Policy and regulation ===
The State Commission on Water Supply and Energy, established in May 2008 and chaired by the Prime Minister, provides policy direction for water supply and sanitation. The Ministry of Regional Development and Infrastructure is responsible for sector administration. Economic regulation of the sector, including the approval of tariffs, is the responsibility of the Georgia National Energy and Water Regulatory Commission. In order to maintain its independence from the executive branch of the government, the Commission is not funded through the government budget, but through membership fees that gas, electricity and water providers contribute in the sum of 0.5% of their income. The Ministry of Environmental Protection and Natural Resources is in charge of water resources management and environmental regulation. The Ministry of Agriculture is responsible for assessing drinking water quality.

In 2009 the government adopted an urban water and sanitation sector development plan "with a vision to ensure continuous and reliable water supply and safe sanitation services to all of Georgia’s urban residents by 2020." Investments of USD 1.65 billion are envisaged from 2011-2020 to reach this goal.

=== Investment management ===
The Municipal Development Fund (MDF) is an entity established by presidential decree that reports to the Ministry of Regional Development and Infrastructure and is under a supervisory board headed by the Prime Minister. It implements investment projects funded by external donors and the government, including in the field of water supply and sanitation.

=== Service provision ===
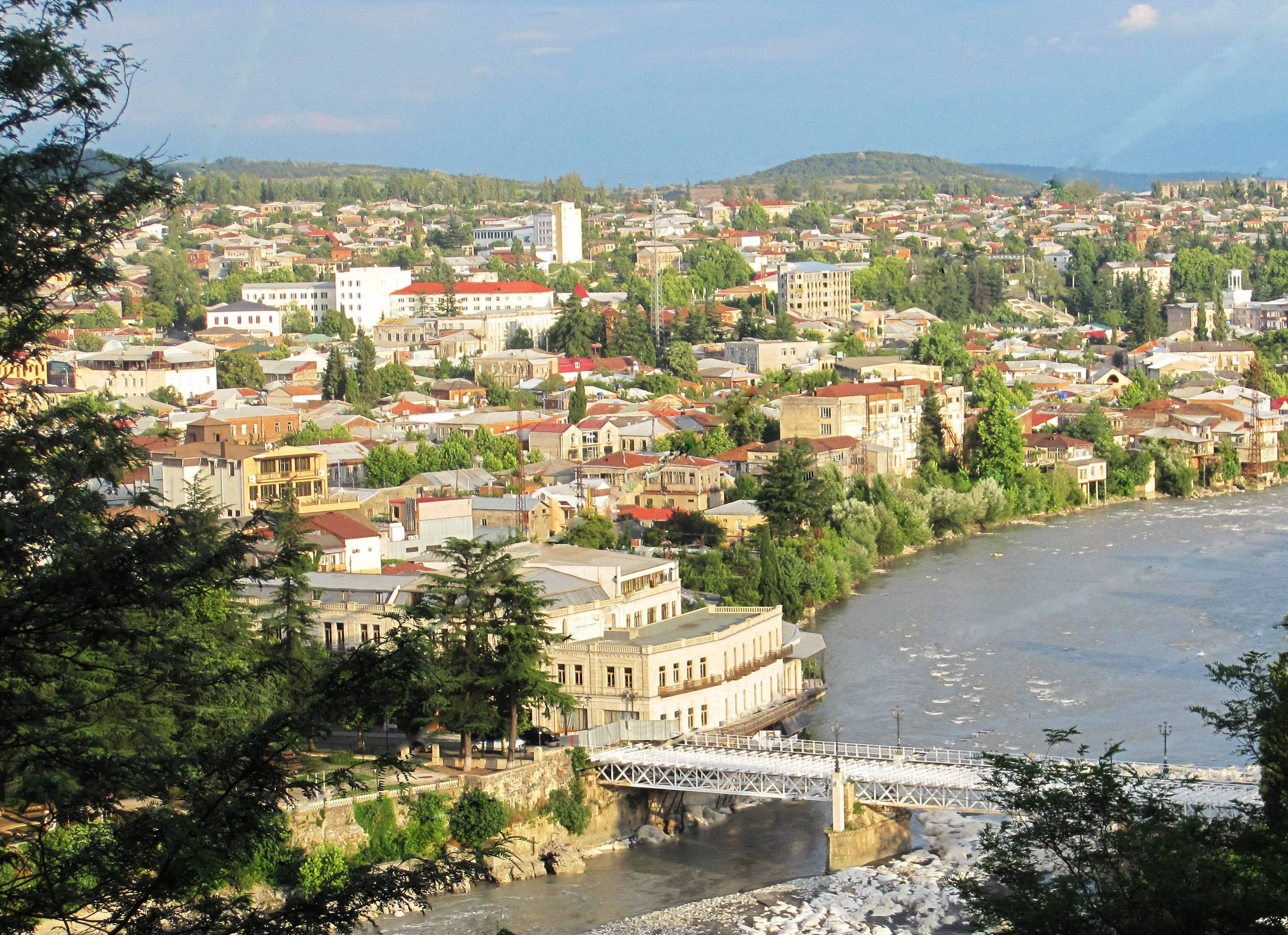
Kutaisi, Georgia's third-largest city, is the largest city served by the United Water Supply Company of Georgia.

Georgian Water and Power (GWP) provides water and wastewater sewer services in Tbilisi and surrounding areas. The company owns three hydropower plants that are mainly used for water production and delivery purposes. As of 2019, GWP served c. 500,000 residential and c. 32,000 commercial customers. Georgian Water and Power is a subsidiary of JSC Georgia Global Utilities that also owns other water utility companies and renewable energy assets across Georgia. JSC Georgia Global Utilities is 100% owned by LSE listed investment platform – Georgia Capital PLC.

The state-owned United Water Supply Company of Georgia (UWSCG) provides water and wastewater services throughout Georgia for urban settlements excluding the service area of GWP and the Autonomous Republic of Adjara. It has 2,700 employees, 303,788 residential customers and 15,400 commercial customers. It was created in 2010 by merging 66 local water companies. According to the ADB, UWSCG’s "effectiveness is severely constrained by the lack of technical and skilled staff to manage the service."

Batumi Water Company, Kobuleti Water Company, and Adjara local self-governments serve the Autonomous Republic of Adjara, with 9% of the country’s population. However, de facto the government in Tbilisi is involved in key decisions related to water supply and sanitation in Adjara.

== Financial aspects ==
=== Tariffs and cost recovery ===
Water and wastewater tariffs are set by the Georgia National Energy and Water Supply Regulatory Commission for three-year regulatory period. Current regulatory period started in 2018 and ends in 2020, after which new tariff levels will reset based on approved tariff-setting methodology.

The water and wastewater tariff in the GWP service area is GEL 4.40 per m^{3} for commercial customers, GEL 0.33 per m^{3}for meted residential customers and GEL 3.89 per capita per month for non-metered customers. GWP is a financially viable company with revenues of c. GEL 145 million and a net profit of c. GEL 35 million as of 2019. GWP operates three hydropower plants, including the 130 Megawatt Zhinvali hydro power plant.

For residential users in the UWSCG service area that have water meters the combined water and sewer tariff was 0.50 Georgian Laris (USD 0.22) per cubic meter in 2016. The tariff for unmetered customers varies between 0.25 and 2.15 Georgian Laris per month depending on the municipality. Commercial customers are all metered and are charged 4.31 Georgian Laris (USD 1.88) per cubic meter, more than eight times as much as residential customers. In 2010 UWSCG had revenues of almost USD 20 million, with nondomestic consumers accounting for 67% of the tariff revenues. UWSCG’s revenue collection efficiency was 72% (49% domestic and 94% nondomestic), with the poor performance attributed to customers’ nonpayment of tariffs in response to poor services. The volumetric tariffs in Adjara are the same as for the service area of UWSCG.

=== Investment ===
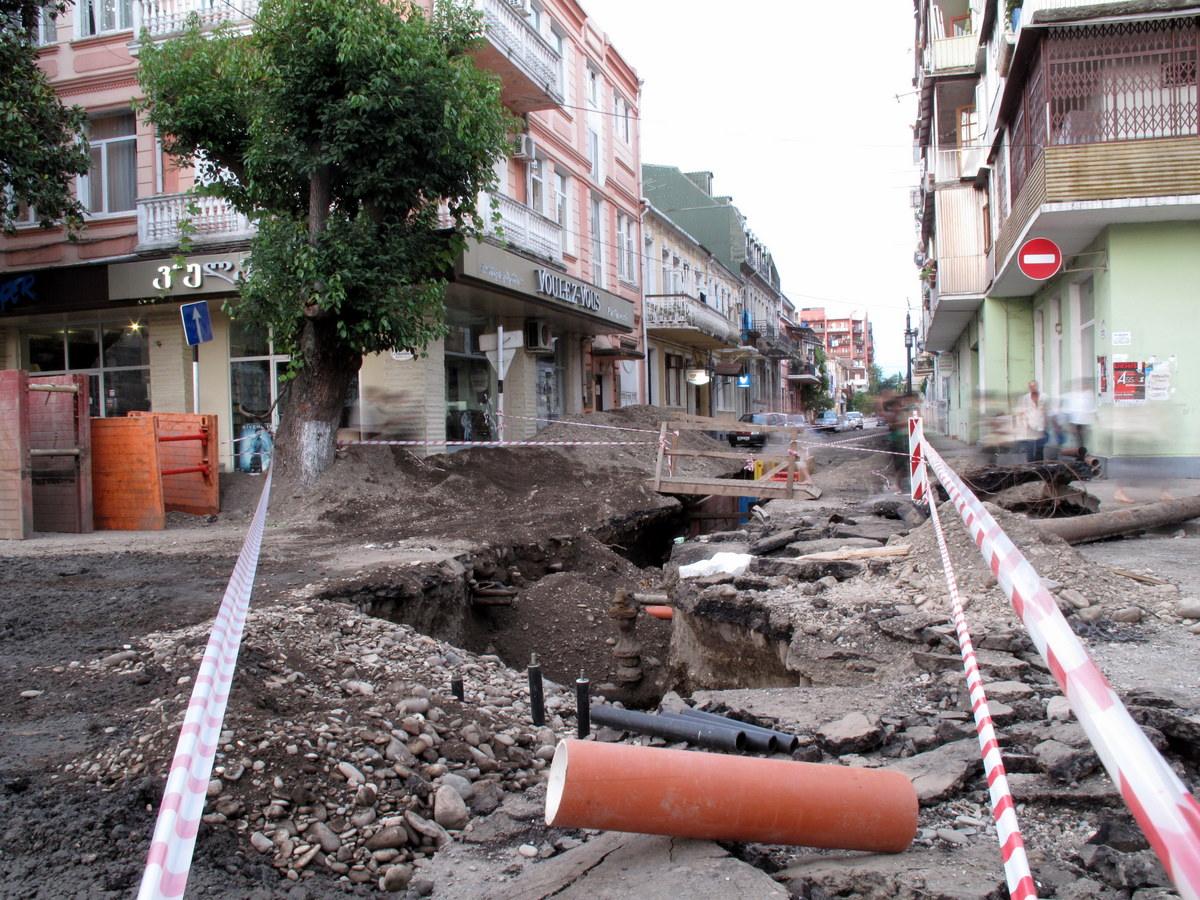
Batumi water supply under repair.

No major rehabilitation works were carried out in the period between 1987 and 2004 and at the time more than 60% of the water distribution infrastructure needed to be replaced. From 2004 on the state and international donors began to invest heavily in reconstruction-rehabilitation, beginning in Tbilisi in 2005-2007. In 2009 about 120 million USD was allocated for the rehabilitation and development of drinking water systems, and an additional 35 million USD for sewerage. However, according to another source actual government financing to improve water and sanitation infrastructure was insignificant as of 2009, with only USD 10 million spent to improve water supply and USD 1 million to improve sewerage nationally — a mere 0.1% of gross domestic product.

=== Financing ===
The main sources of financing for urban water supply and sanitation in Georgia outside the capital are loans and grants from external donors as well as the state budget. In the capital the main sources of financing are equity provided by the private owners of the company, the proceeds of local currency bonds and retained earnings.

== External Cooperation ==
The major external partners of Georgia in water supply and sanitation are the Asian Development Bank (ADB), the European Bank for Reconstruction and Development (EBRD), the European Investment Bank (EIB), the European Commission, Germany, the Netherlands, Sweden, the United States and the World Bank.

=== Asian Development Bank ===
The Asian Development Bank (ADB) began to engage in the Georgian water sector in 2008. In February 2015 ADB and the government signed a $108 million loan agreement for a project to improve water services in Zugdidi and sanitation services in Poti. Prior to the project, 84% of people in Zugdidi had no access to piped water. In Poti, a comprehensive sewage collection and treatment facility will be built. The project will also support the implementation of a public awareness program, including information on hygiene and sanitation. The project is the fourth under a $500 million multitranche financing program. A fifth loan for $75 million to support a sewerage system in Zugdidi, and a sewage treatment plant in Mestia, was approved in September 2015.

=== European Bank for Reconstruction and Development ===
The EBRD co-financed a project to improve water and waste water services in Kobuleti through the Municipal Development Fund of Georgia. The project is co-financed from a grant provided by ORET (Netherlands) and the Millennium Challenge Corporation (USA).

=== European Investment Bank ===
The European Investment Bank lends EUR 100 million to finance wastewater collection and treatment infrastructure in Kutaisi, Georgia’s third largest city.

=== Germany and the European Union ===
Germany, through its development bank KfW, finances improvements in water supply and sanitation in Batumi since 2006. Prior to the project untreated wastewater was discharged into the Black Sea, tap water was not drinkable and water supply was intermittent. The project is also supported through a 9.5m EUR grant of the European Union. It includes the construction of a modern wastewater treatment plant, a functioning stormwater discharge system and the installation of about 37,300 water meters in multi-apartment buildings. These households will be billed based on their consumption, which is expected to be reduced from about 750 litres per day to below 200.

=== United States ===
The US Millennium Challenge Corporation, through the Georgian Municipal Development Fund, supported a USD 57.7 million regional infrastructure development project for improvement of municipal water and sewerage services in five cities throughout Georgia.

=== World Bank ===
The World Bank has been engaged in municipal infrastructure in Georgia since 1995. It currently finances water supply and sanitation projects through the USD 30 million Second Regional and Municipal Infrastructure Development Project approved in 2014 and implemented by the Municipal Development Fund of Georgia. About 35% of the project will support drinking water supply and about 25% sanitation.
