= FDI stock =

Value of share of capital and reserves in foreign direct investment

FDI stock is the value of the share of capital and reserves (including retained profits) attributable to the parent enterprise, plus the net indebtedness of affiliates to the parent enterprise.

Inward stock is the value of the capital and reserves in the economy attributable to a parent enterprise resident in a different economy. Outward stock is the value of capital and reserves in another economy attributable to a parent enterprise resident in the economy.

== See also ==
- Foreign direct investment
