= List of Asian countries by average wage =

This is the map and list of Asian countries by monthly average wage (annual divided by 12 months) gross and net income (after taxes) average wages for full-time employees in their local currency and in US Dollar. The chart below reflects the average (mean) wage as reported by various data providers. The salary distribution is right-skewed, therefore more than 50% of people earn less than the average gross salary. Thus, the median figures provided further below might be more representative than averages.

== Maps ==
=== Gross average monthly salary ===
The countries and territories have a gross average monthly salary of:

Green	above $2,000
Blue	$1,000 to $1,999
Orange	$500 to $999
Red	below $500

=== Net average monthly salary ===
The countries and territories have a net average monthly salary of:

Green	above $2,000
Blue	$1,000 to $1,999
Orange	$500 to $999
Red	below $500

== Asian countries by monthly average wage ==
Country names displayed in italics represent transcontinental states (part of both Europe and Asia).

Country	Monthly average wage					Exchange rate to $	Date (quarter)
Country	Local currency		US dollar		US dollar, PPP-converted (Note: Formula: Net amount in local currency / (divided by) PPP conversion rate. The value is expressed in international dollars (Geary–Khamis dollar).)	Exchange rate to $	Date (quarter)
Country	Gross	Net	Gross	Net	Net	Exchange rate to $	Date (quarter)
Afghanistan	؋17,800	؋15,100	242	205	979	0.0136	2023-10
Armenia	֏ 313,353	֏ 229,215	815	596	1,446	0.00260	2026-04
Azerbaijan	₼1,172	₼1,010	690	594	1,860	0.59	2026-04
Bahrain	.د.ب 426	.د.ب 406	1,133	1,081	2,213	2.66	2025
Bangladesh	৳26,867	৳26,867	243	243	874	0.009	2023-10
Bhutan	Nu. 38,920	Nu. 37,250	467	448	1,781	0.012	2023-10
Brunei	B$2,316	B$2,316	1,708	1,708	4,128	0.7376	2023-10
Cambodia	៛134,451,900	៛134,451,900	336	336	976	0.00025	2025
China	CN¥ 10,787 (urban non-private sector); CN¥ 5,966 (urban private sector)	CN¥ 7,614 (urban non-private sector); CN¥ 4,251 (urban private sector)	1,586 (urban non-private sector); 877 (urban private sector)	1,119 (urban non-private sector); 625 (urban private sector)	2,201 (urban non-private sector); 1,229 (urban private sector)	0.147	2025
Cyprus	€2,932	€2,444	3,353	2,795	4,137	1.14	2025 (Q4)
(Timor-Leste) Timor Leste	US$175	US$175	175	175	381	1.0	2023-10
(Georgia (country)) Georgia	₾2,364	₾1,891	896	716	1,739	0.379	2026 (Q1)
Hong Kong	HK$21,200	HK$19,716	2,704	2,515	3,676	0.128	2025-Q2
India	₹17,166 (self employed urban males) ₹9,661 (self employed rural males)	₹15,106 (self employed urban males) ₹8,502 (self employed rural males)	206 (self employed urban males); 116 (self employed rural males)	181 (self employed urban males); 102 (self employed rural males)	785 (self employed urban males); 442 (self employed rural males)	0.012	2022
Indonesia	Rp 3,331,012	Rp 3,060,028	194	179	604	0.000058	2025-08
Iran	﷼10,458,000	﷼10,458,000	249	249	1,253	0.00002381	2026-06
Iraq	د.ع 741,398	د.ع 719,453	568	550	1,283	0.000764	2023-10
Israel	₪14,344	₪11,340	4,958	3,922	3,102	0.345	2026-02
Japan	¥475,253	¥367,846	3,176	2,458	3,560	0.006682	2025
Jordan	د.أ 544	د.أ 503	767	709	1,515	1.41	2022
Kazakhstan	₸461,486	₸378,472	985	807	1,982	0.002134	2026 (Q1)
Kuwait	د.ك 670	د.ك 600	2,187	1,961	3,265	3.237	2024-06
Malaysia	RM8,000	RM4,046	1,958	990	2,460	0.2336	2026
Kyrgyzstan	KGS 29,331	KGS 23,823	335	272	812	0.01143	2025
Laos	₭3,000,000	₭2,875,000	134	128	490	0.00004458	2026-06
Lebanon	ل.ل 7,100,000	ل.ل 6,200,000	470	410	1,010	0.0000666	2023-10
Maldives	Rf. 14,192	Rf. 14,192	920	920	1,479	0.065	2023-10
Mongolia	₮2,672,000	₮2,326,000	781	680	2,083	0.0002924	2024
Myanmar	K 350,000	K 310,000	310	290	569	0.0005	2023-10
Nepal	रू 32,000	रू 28,329	240	213	816	0.0075	2023-10
North Korea	₩10,000	₩10,000	10	10	30	0.001	2023-10
Oman	ر.ع. 915	ر.ع. 842	2,377	2,187	4,448	2.6	2023-10
Pakistan	₨44,300	₨44,000	158	157	742	0.00356	2023
Philippines	₱21,544	₱20,559	376	358	991	0.017	2024
Qatar	ر.ق 12,416	ر.ق 11,795	3,411	3,240	4,281	0.274	2024
Russia	112,654 ₽	98,009 ₽	1,428	1,243	3,187	0.01268	2026-03
Saudi Arabia	ر.س 5,544	ر.س 5,000	1,478	1,333	2,656	0.267	2024-06
Singapore	S$6,593	S$5,119	5,106	3,965	4,850	0.78	2026 (Q1)
South Korea	₩4,729,150	₩3,948,840	3,325	2,776	4,487	0.0007030	2025
Sri Lanka	රු.65,100	රු.59,900	199	182	662	0.003	2023-10
Syria	£S 680,000	£S 572,100	52	44	100	0.000077	2023-10
Taiwan	NT$67,204	NT$60,310	2,122	1,909	4,474	0.031668	2025
Tajikistan	SM 2,110	SM 1,858	192	169	688	0.0911	2023-10
Thailand	฿15,738	฿14,864	480	454	1,363	0.031	2024 (Q4)
Turkey	₺47,346	₺33,913	1,445	1,033	2,702	0.026	2024
Turkmenistan	T 3,080	T 2,767	881	792	1,586	0.286	2023-10
United Arab Emirates	DH 12,745	DH 12,108	3,470	3,297	4,665	0.272	2023-04
Uzbekistan	UZS 5,800,000	UZS 4,280,000	471	348	1,351	0.00008	2023-10
Vietnam	₫9,100,000	₫8,144,500	355	317	1,254	0.000039	2026-11
Yemen	﷼132,500	﷼93,886	529	375	245	0.004	2023-10

== See also ==
- List of countries by average wage
- List of American countries by average wage
- List of European countries by average wage
