= Chamber of Commerce and Industry of the Republic of Abkhazia =

Commerce organization in Abkhazia

The Chamber of Commerce and Industry of the Republic of Abkhazia (Russian: Торгово-Промышленная Палата Республики Абхазия) was founded on 18 March 2002 through a decree of President Vladislav Ardzinba. Former Prime Minister Gennady Gagulia has been its Chairman since its inception. Its First Vice President is former Economy and former Taxes and Fees Minister Adgur Lushba, its Vice Presidents Vadim Gurji and former Foreign Minister Maxim Gvinjia.

On 9 March 2012, the Chamber signed a cooperation agreement with the State of Tuvalu, represented by its Prime Minister Willy Telavi. On 21 August, it signed a memorandum of understanding with the Bratislava Regional Chamber of the Slovak Chamber of Commerce and Industry. On 31 October, it signed a Memorandum of Understanding and Cooperation with the Bulgarian Chamber of Commerce and Industry.
