= List of Finnish regions by life expectancy =

Finland is administratively divided into 19 regions. One of regions, Åland, has a special status and a higher degree of autonomy due to its unique history and the fact that the overwhelming majority of its people are Finland Swedes. According to estimation of Statistics Finland, life expectancy at birth in the country in 2023 was 81.57 years (78.96 years for male and 84.19 years for female).

According to alternative estimation of the United Nations, in 2023 life expectancy in Finland was 81.91 years (79.17 for male, 84.67 for female).

Estimation of the World Bank Group for 2023: 81.69 years total (79.10 for male, 84.40 for female).

Estimation of Eurostat for 2023: 81.6 years total (79.0 for male, 84.3 for female).

According to estimation of the WHO for 2019, at that year life expectancy in Finland was 81.65 years (79.11 years for male and 84.15 years for female).
And healthy life expectancy was 70.19 years (69.05 years for male and 71.29 years for female).

In 2022–2024 period, the difference in life expectancy between the most prosperous and disadvantaged regions was 3.55 years.
In 2019–2021, this difference was 3.30 years.

== Statistics Finland ==
Average values for 3-year periods. By default the table is sorted by 2019–2021.

region	2019–2021				Δ1	2020–2022				Δ2	2021–2023				Δ3	2022–2024				total change
region	overall	male	female	F Δ M	Δ1	overall	male	female	F Δ M	Δ2	overall	male	female	F Δ M	Δ3	overall	male	female	F Δ M	total change
Finland on average	81.83	79.11	84.54	5.43	−0.23	81.60	78.93	84.28	5.35	−0.08	81.52	78.91	84.14	5.23	0.13	81.65	79.07	84.24	5.17	−0.18
Åland	83.75	81.28	86.30	5.02	−0.28	83.47	81.17	85.84	4.67	0.57	84.04	81.77	86.44	4.67	−0.31	83.73	81.40	86.12	4.72	−0.02
Ostrobothnia	83.27	81.24	85.35	4.11	−0.17	83.10	81.05	85.21	4.16	−0.05	83.05	80.86	85.33	4.47	0.07	83.12	80.91	85.45	4.54	−0.15
Central Ostrobothnia	82.55	80.08	85.10	5.02	−0.23	82.32	79.85	84.90	5.05	−0.05	82.27	80.40	84.13	3.73	−0.05	82.22	80.51	83.91	3.40	−0.33
Pirkanmaa	82.51	80.04	84.85	4.81	−0.33	82.18	79.75	84.52	4.77	−0.28	81.90	79.41	84.34	4.93	−0.06	81.84	79.22	84.42	5.20	−0.67
Southwest Finland	82.35	79.59	85.05	5.46	−0.21	82.14	79.50	84.74	5.24	−0.20	81.94	79.26	84.60	5.34	0.04	81.98	79.35	84.58	5.23	−0.37
South Ostrobothnia	82.25	79.62	84.95	5.33	−0.42	81.83	79.24	84.49	5.25	−0.45	81.38	78.86	83.99	5.13	−0.22	81.16	78.74	83.68	4.94	−1.09
Uusimaa	82.15	79.41	84.68	5.27	−0.24	81.91	79.23	84.39	5.16	0.03	81.94	79.38	84.30	4.92	0.21	82.15	79.69	84.41	4.72	0.00
Central Finland	81.93	79.23	84.68	5.45	−0.40	81.53	78.74	84.42	5.68	−0.26	81.27	78.54	84.11	5.57	0.16	81.43	78.52	84.48	5.96	−0.50
North Ostrobothnia	81.93	79.16	84.84	5.68	−0.27	81.66	78.98	84.47	5.49	−0.05	81.61	79.16	84.17	5.01	0.16	81.77	79.32	84.33	5.01	−0.16
Kanta-Häme	81.64	78.78	84.52	5.74	0.05	81.69	79.09	84.30	5.21	−0.11	81.58	79.12	84.04	4.92	0.26	81.84	79.39	84.32	4.93	0.20
Päijät-Häme	81.20	78.40	83.94	5.54	−0.13	81.07	78.40	83.68	5.28	−0.30	80.77	77.99	83.55	5.56	0.07	80.84	78.19	83.47	5.28	−0.36
Lapland	81.13	78.50	83.95	5.45	−0.15	80.98	78.16	84.06	5.90	−0.15	80.83	78.16	83.72	5.56	0.01	80.84	78.57	83.27	4.70	−0.29
North Savo	81.06	78.26	83.97	5.71	−0.21	80.85	77.95	83.91	5.96	−0.04	80.81	77.92	83.84	5.92	0.26	81.07	78.20	84.07	5.87	0.01
Satakunta	81.04	78.07	84.15	6.08	−0.39	80.65	77.83	83.62	5.79	−0.17	80.48	77.73	83.36	5.63	0.19	80.67	77.81	83.68	5.87	−0.37
South Karelia	80.90	77.96	83.92	5.96	0.17	81.07	78.02	84.28	6.26	0.08	81.15	78.28	84.21	5.93	0.30	81.45	78.44	84.67	6.23	0.55
South Savo	80.85	77.85	84.03	6.18	−0.39	80.46	77.49	83.62	6.13	0.02	80.48	77.71	83.45	5.74	0.21	80.69	78.04	83.51	5.47	−0.16
North Karelia	80.67	77.69	83.91	6.22	0.15	80.82	77.92	83.97	6.05	0.10	80.92	78.08	83.98	5.90	0.02	80.94	77.99	84.14	6.15	0.27
Kymenlaakso	80.47	77.39	83.71	6.32	0.03	80.50	77.49	83.69	6.20	0.09	80.59	77.43	84.00	6.57	0.23	80.82	77.79	84.05	6.26	0.35
Kainuu	80.45	77.89	83.20	5.31	−0.50	79.95	77.47	82.63	5.16	−0.08	79.87	77.11	82.97	5.86	0.31	80.18	77.24	83.56	6.32	−0.27

Data source: Statistics Finland

Maps of division of Finland into regions and NUTS-2 regions:

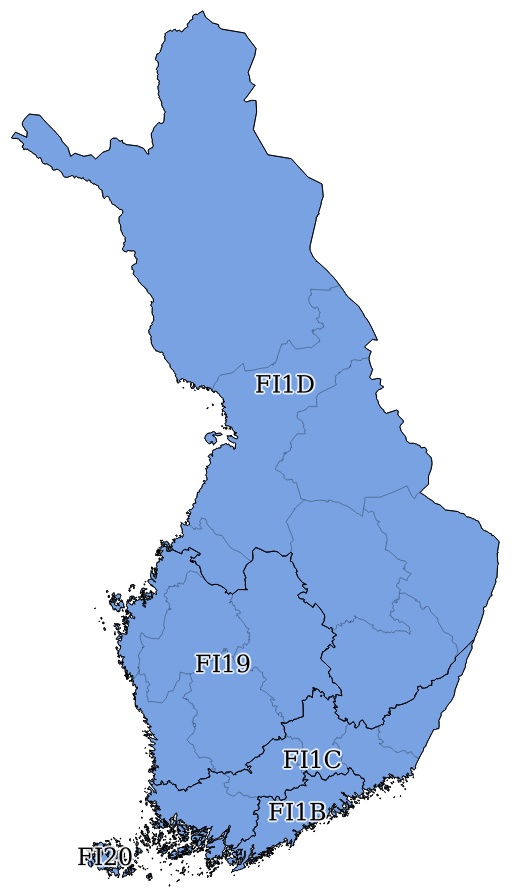

== Eurostat (2019—2023) ==
By default, the table is sorted by 2023.

code	NUTS-2 region	2014				2014 →2019	2019				2019 →2023	2023				2014 →2023
code	NUTS-2 region	overall	male	female	F Δ M	2014 →2019	overall	male	female	F Δ M	2019 →2023	overall	male	female	F Δ M	2014 →2023
	Finland on average	81.3	78.4	84.1	5.7	0.8	82.1	79.3	84.8	5.5	−0.5	81.6	79.0	84.3	5.3	0.3
FI20	Åland	83.0	81.3	84.7	3.4	0.9	83.9	81.7	86.4	4.7	1.2	85.1	82.0	88.5	6.5	2.1
FI1B	Helsinki-Uusimaa	81.8	79.1	84.3	5.2	0.8	82.6	79.9	85.1	5.2	−0.4	82.2	79.7	84.5	4.8	0.4
FI19	Western Finland	81.4	78.4	84.3	5.9	0.9	82.3	79.7	85.0	5.3	−0.9	81.4	78.8	84.2	5.4	0.0
FI1C	Southern Finland	81.1	78.1	84.0	5.9	0.6	81.7	78.7	84.7	6.0	−0.3	81.4	78.7	84.2	5.5	0.3
FI1D	North & East Finland	80.7	77.6	83.9	6.3	0.8	81.5	78.9	84.2	5.3	−0.3	81.2	78.7	83.9	5.2	0.5

Data source: Eurostat

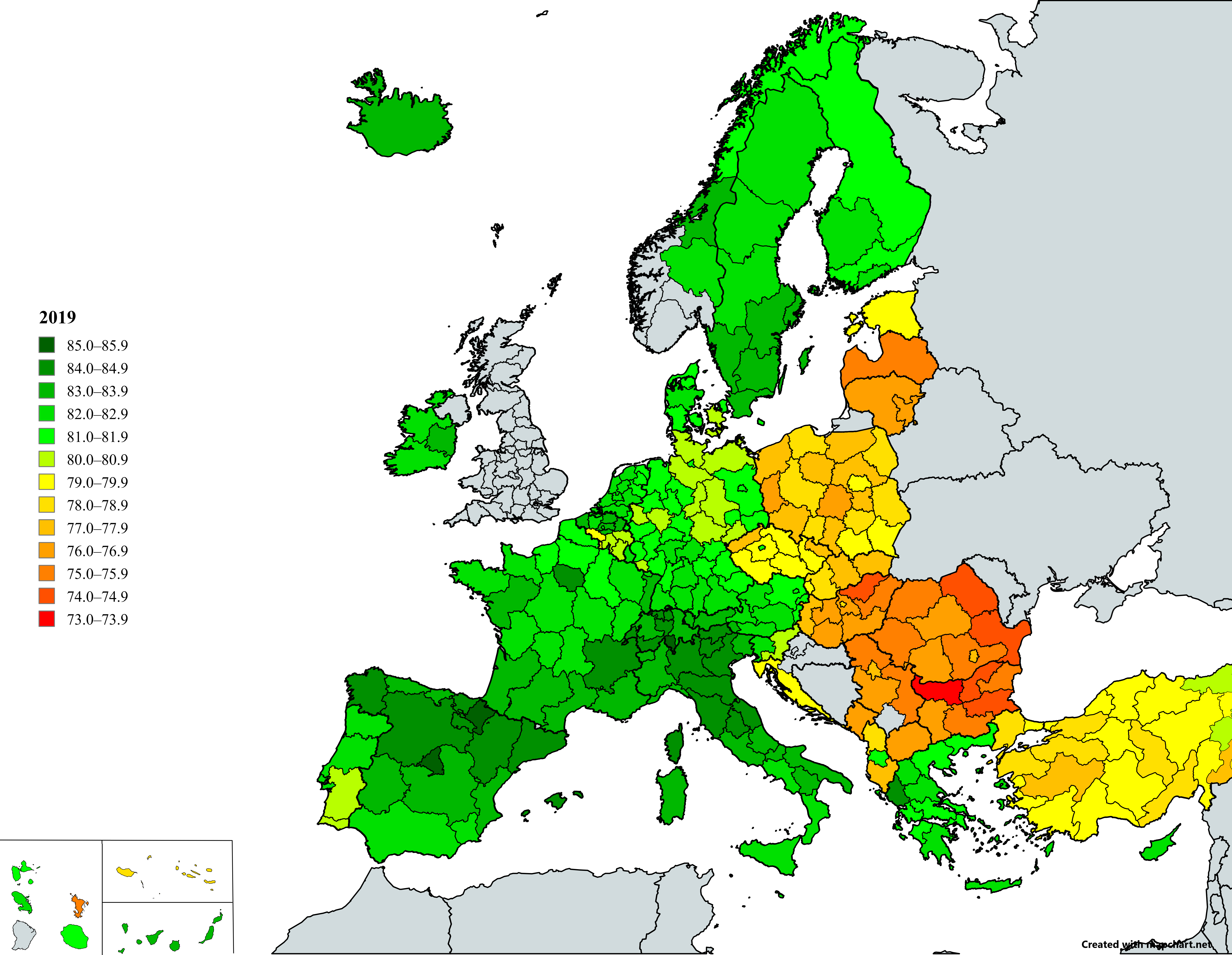
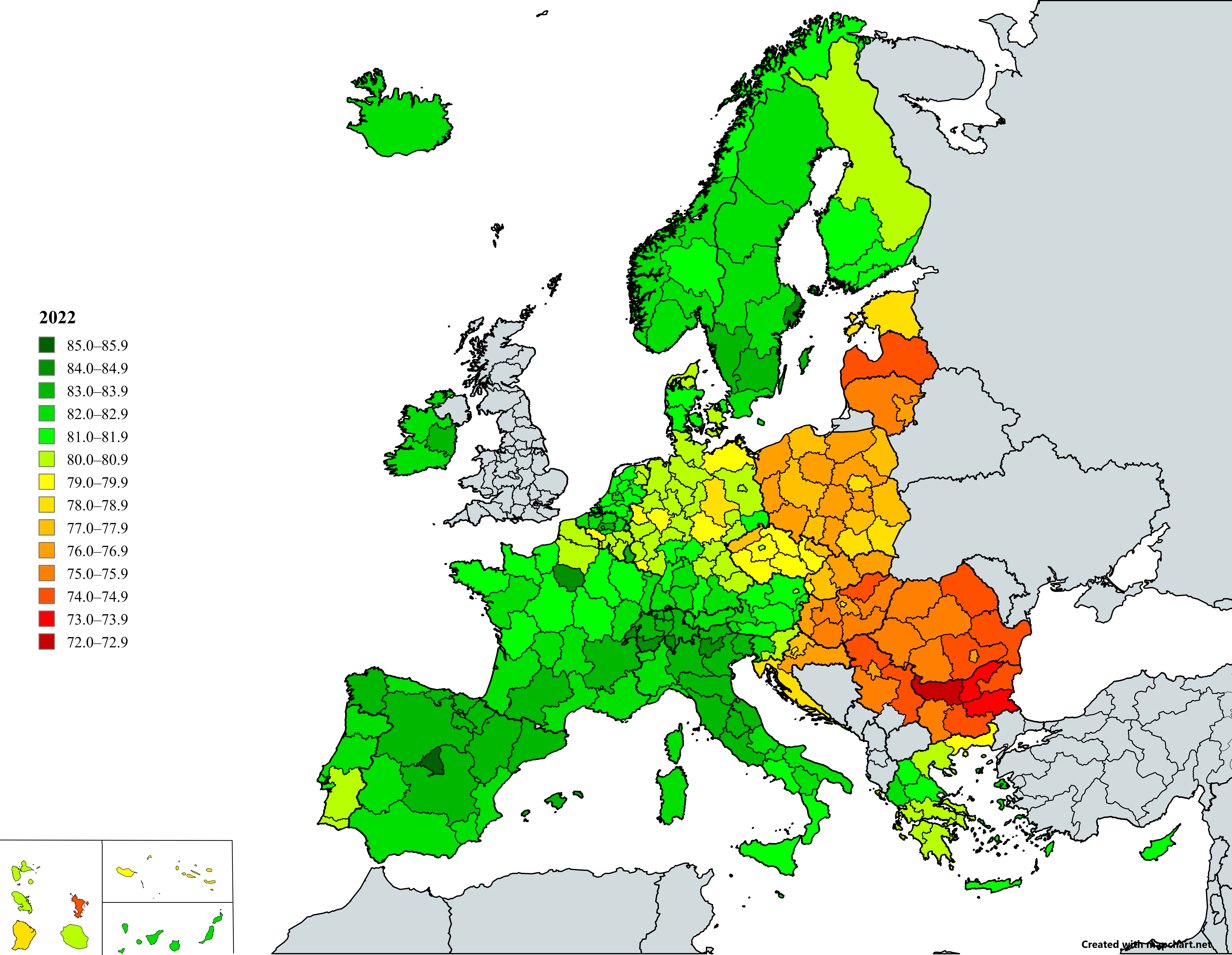
Life expectancy in Finnish regions in comparison with regions of other European countries in 2019 and 2022, according to Eurostat
(legends on the maps are identical)

== Global Data Lab (2019–2022) ==
region	2019				2019 →2021	2021	2021 →2022	2022				2019 →2022
region	overall	male	female	F Δ M	2019 →2021	overall	2021 →2022	overall	male	female	F Δ M	2019 →2022
Finland on average	81.87	79.18	84.52	5.34	0.17	82.04	0.31	82.35	79.79	84.89	5.10	0.48
Åland	83.68	81.49	86.12	4.63	1.02	84.70	−0.45	84.25	82.32	86.10	3.78	0.57
Helsinki-Uusimaa	82.38	79.70	84.83	5.13	0.02	82.40	0.43	82.83	80.29	85.09	4.80	0.45
Western Finland	82.08	79.50	84.73	5.23	0.32	82.40	−0.08	82.32	79.78	84.89	5.11	0.24
Southern Finland	81.48	78.50	84.43	5.93	0.22	81.70	0.62	82.32	79.68	84.99	5.31	0.84
North & East Finland	81.28	78.70	83.93	5.23	0.12	81.40	0.31	81.71	79.17	84.48	5.31	0.43

Data source: Global Data Lab

== Charts ==
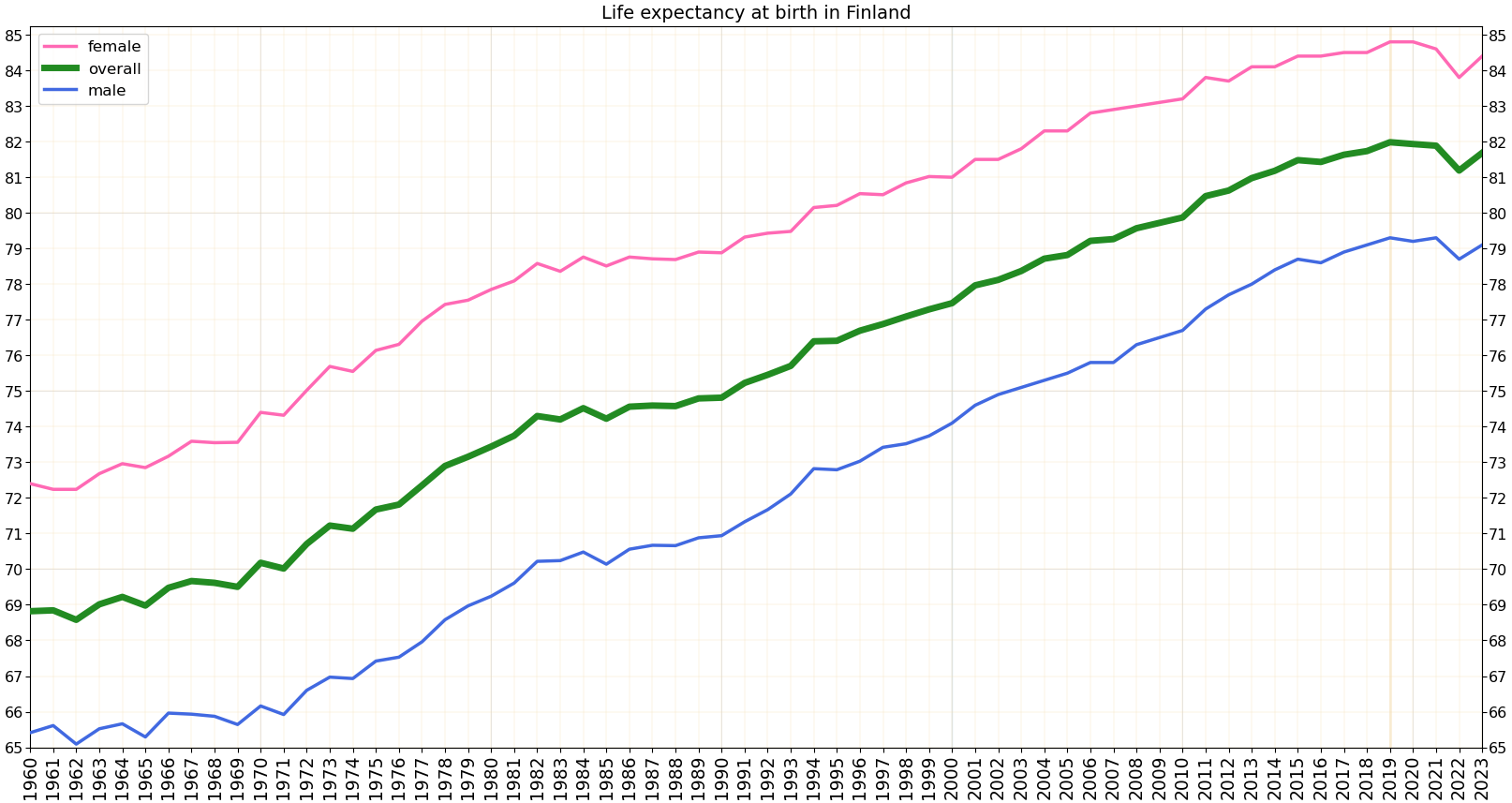
Development of life expectancy in Finland according to estimation of the World Bank Group

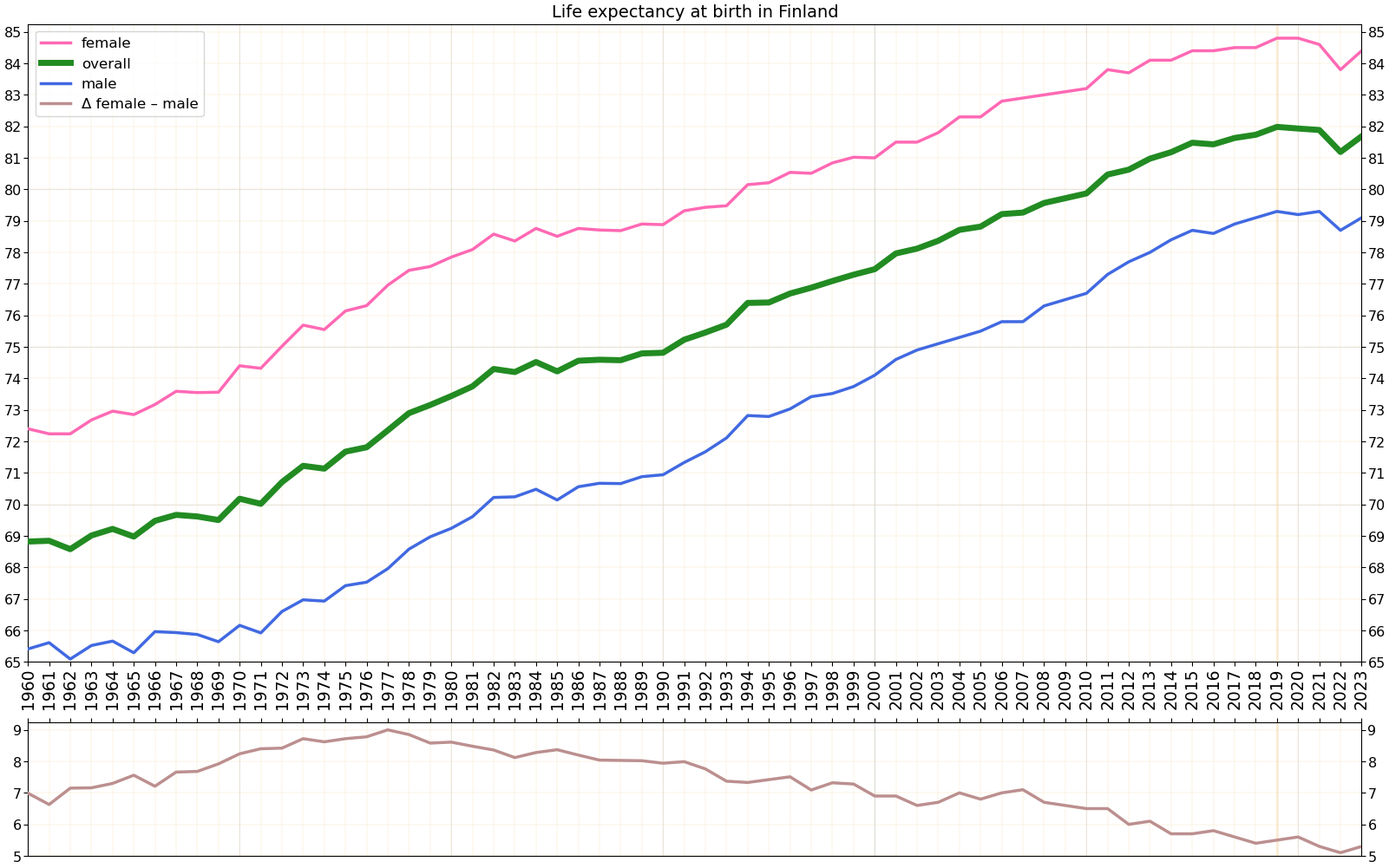
Life expectancy with calculated sex gap

Life expectancy in Finland according to estimation of Our World in Data

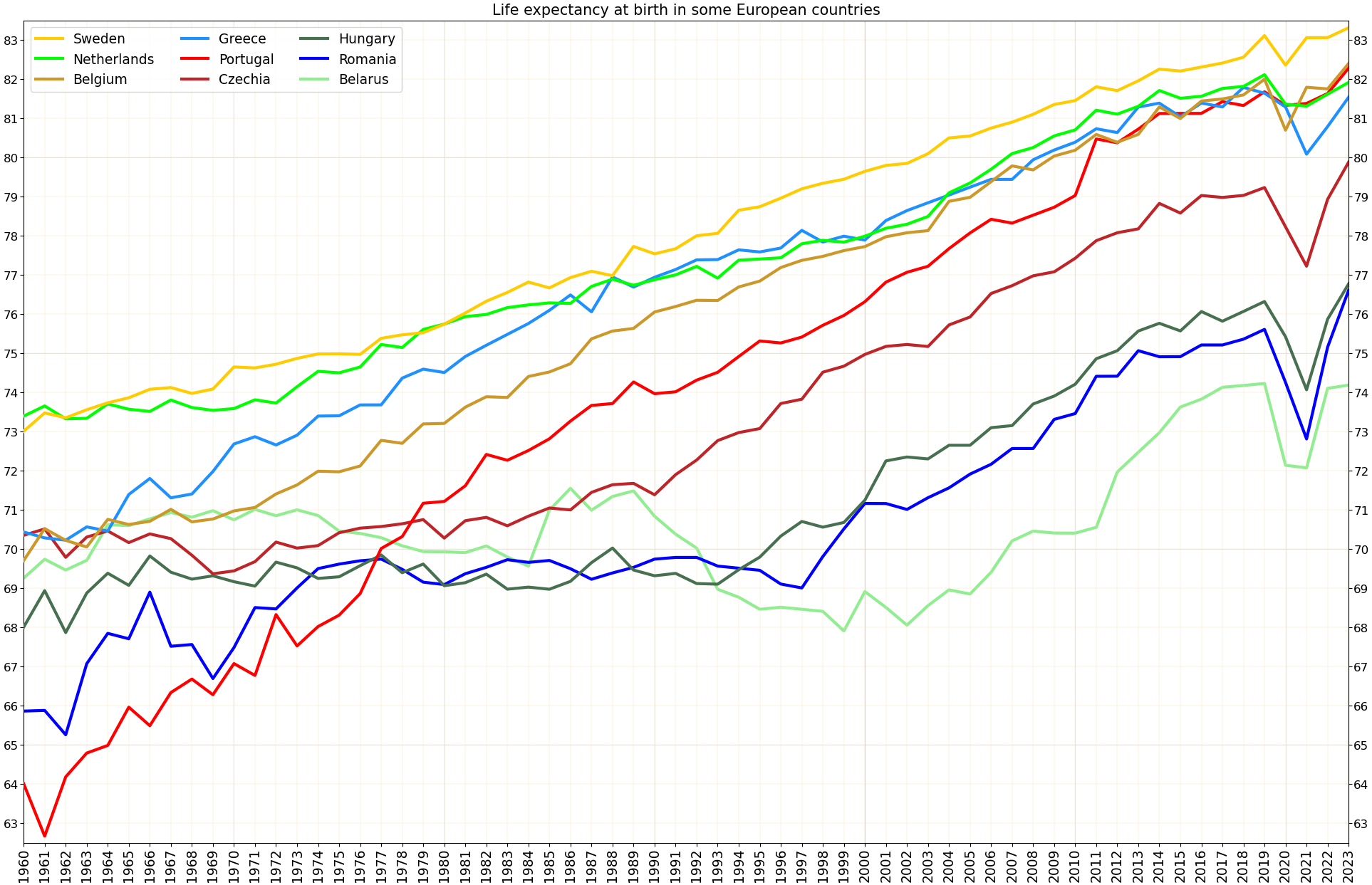
Development of life expectancy in Finland in comparison to some European countries

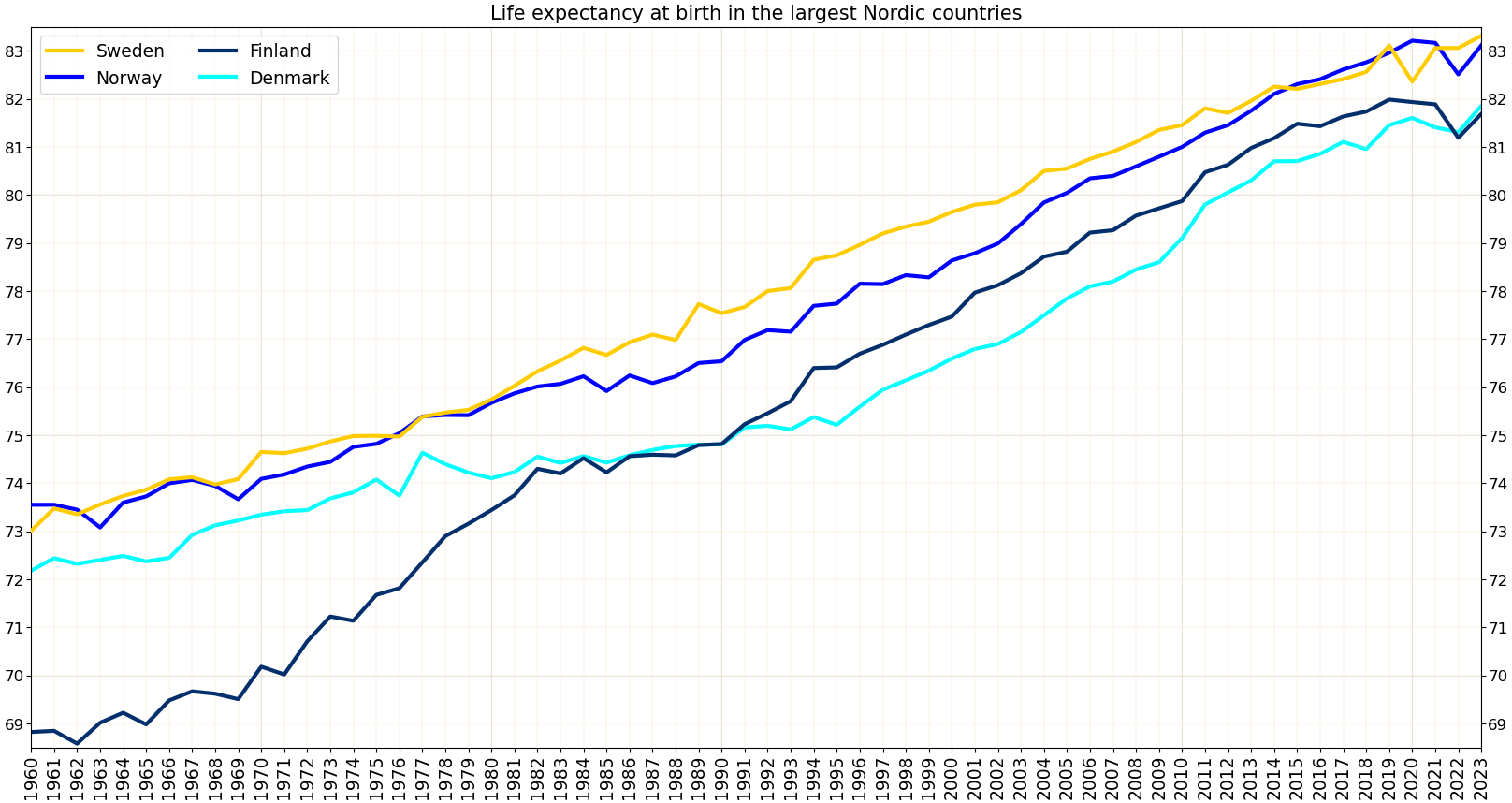
Development of life expectancy in Finland in comparison to the other large Nordic countries

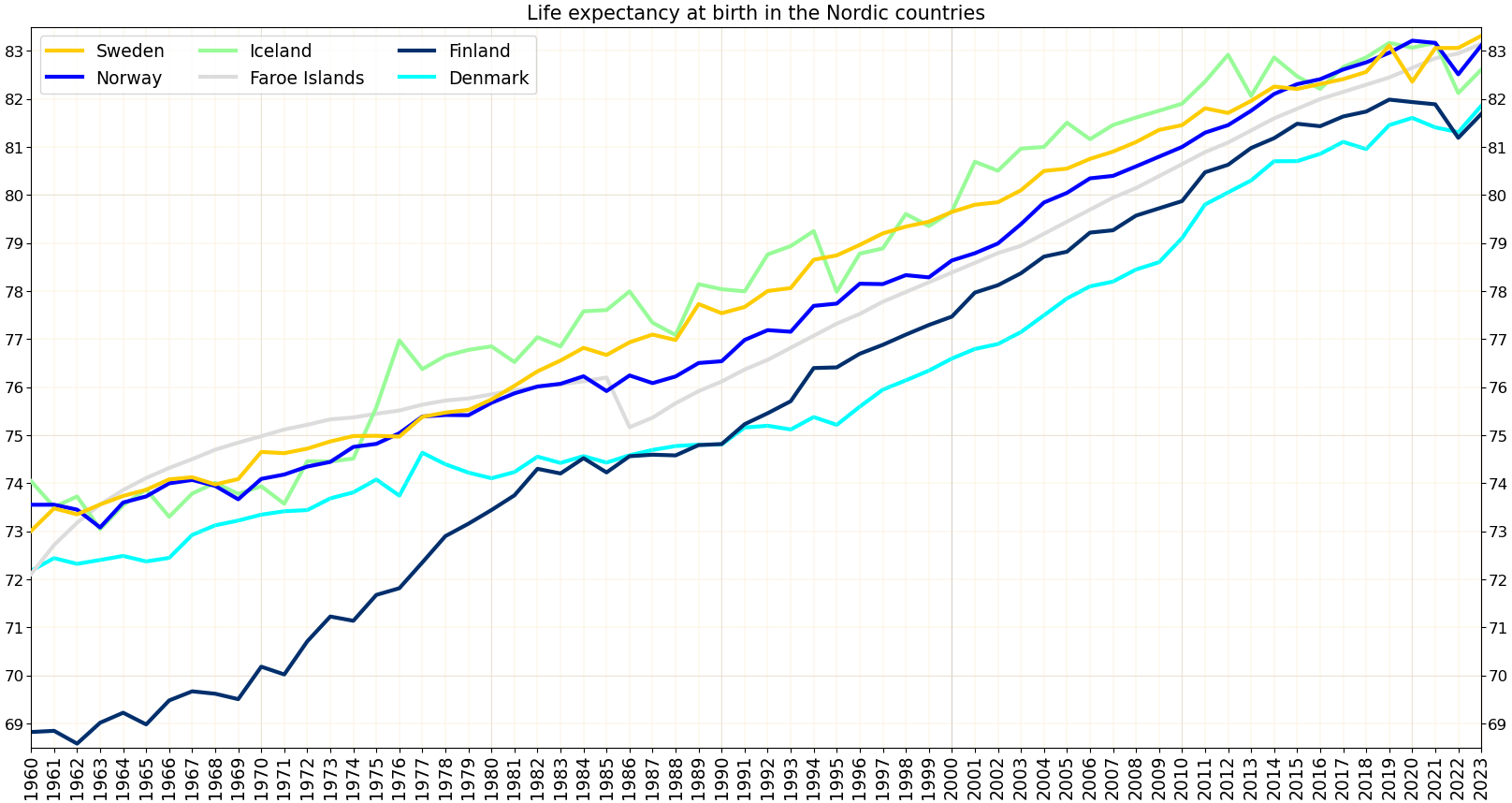
Development of life expectancy in Finland in comparison to the other Nordic countries
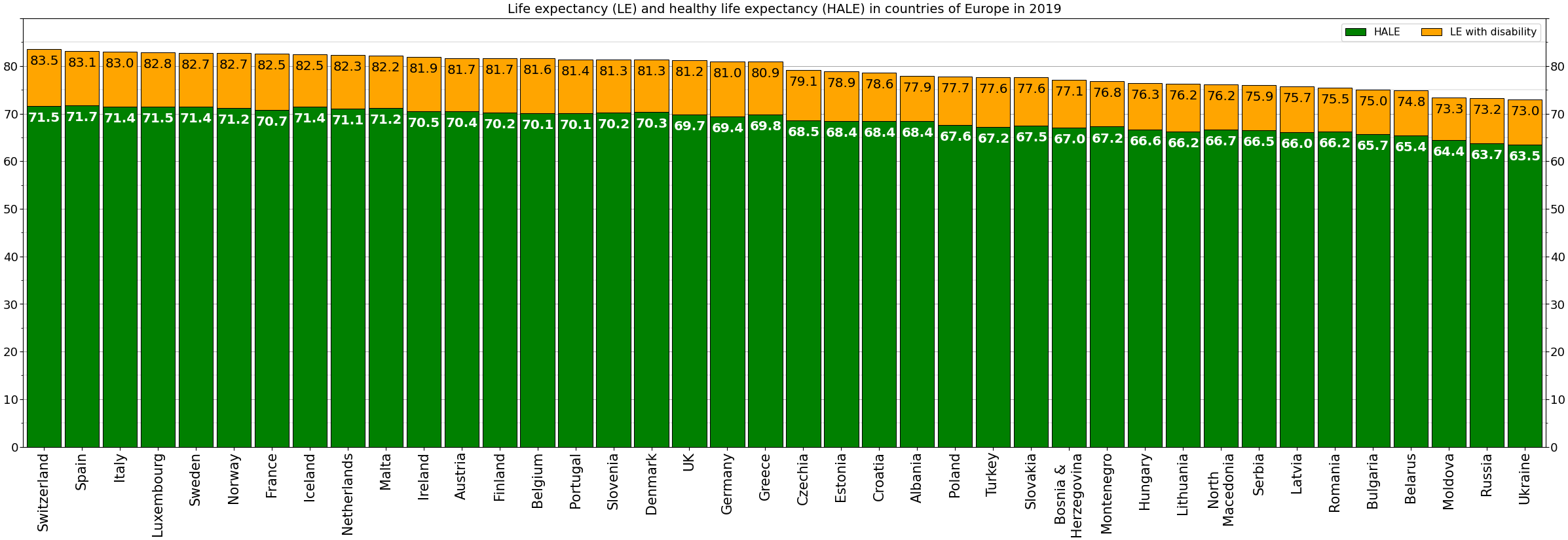
Life expectancy and healthy life expectancy in Finland on the background of other countries of Europe in 2019

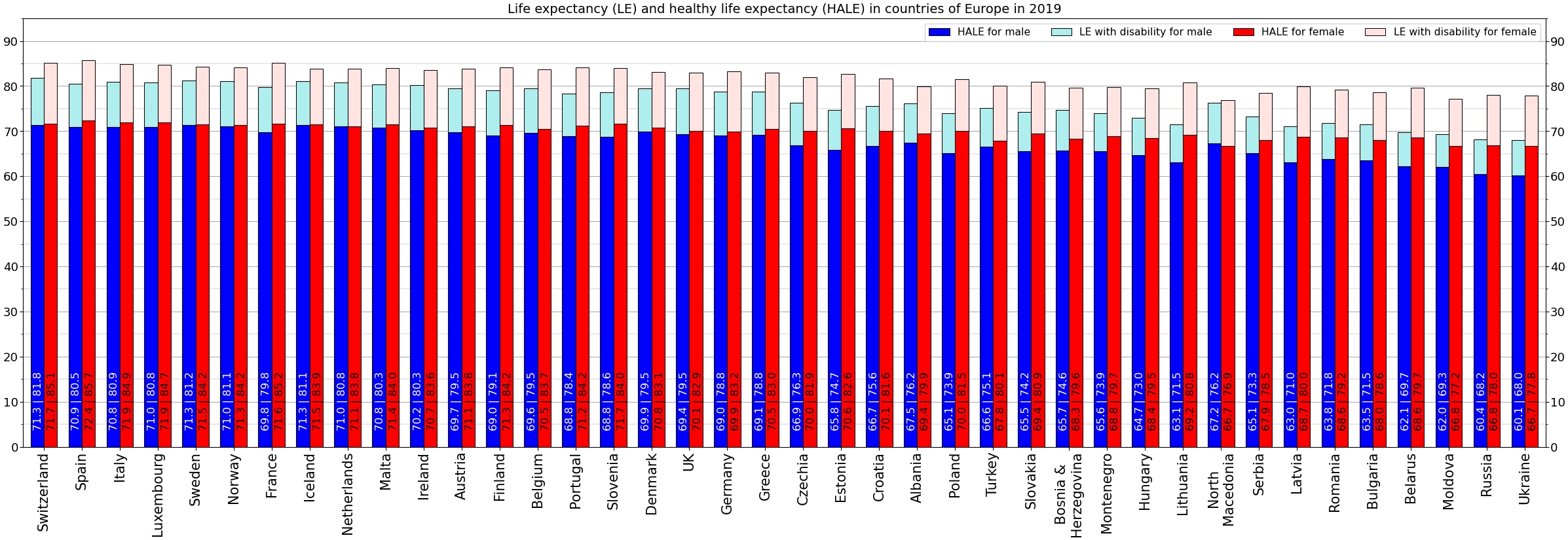
Life expectancy and healthy life expectancy for males and females separately

== See also ==
- List of countries by life expectancy
- List of European countries by life expectancy
- Demographics of Finland
