= SIMM (disambiguation) =

SIMM is an abbreviation for single in-line memory module.

SIMM may also refer to:

- Service Integration Maturity Model, a standardized model for organizations to guide their SOA transformation journey
- SIMM (CAD), a musculoskeletal simulation software produced by MusculoGraphics, Inc.
- Standard Initial Margin Model, a standardized model for the calculation of a margin payment between two counterparties
