= Integris IT =

American managed IT services provider

Integris
- Type: Privately held company
- Industry: Managed IT services
- Founded: October 2021; 4 years ago
- Headquarters: Cranbury, New Jersey, U.S.
- Key people: Rashaad Bajwa (CEO); Kevin Blake (president)
- Services: Managed IT services, cybersecurity, cloud services, network services, compliance support, IT consulting, AI services
- Owner: OMERS Private Equity (majority stake)
- Website: integrisit.com

Integris is an American managed service provider headquartered in Cranbury, New Jersey. The company provides managed IT, cybersecurity, cloud, network, IT consulting and compliance-related services to small and midsize businesses, and from 2025 has placed growing emphasis on artificial intelligence in both its internal service delivery and its broader strategy.

The Integris brand was created in 2021 through the merger of four regional managed service providers: Domain Technology Partners, Compudyne, ProviDyn and MyITpros. The company has roots in Domain Computer Services, which was founded in 1997 by Rashaad and Michelle Bajwa. Integris has expanded through acquisitions of managed service providers and cybersecurity businesses in the United States. In 2026, Integris announced a proposed acquisition of First Focus in Australia, subject to regulatory approval.

== History ==
Domain Computer Services was founded in 1997 by Rashaad and Michelle Bajwa. In October 2021, Domain Technology Partners, Compudyne, ProviDyn and MyITpros merged to form Integris, backed by Frontenac. Rashaad Bajwa, previously chief executive officer of Domain Technology Partners, became chief executive officer of the combined company. At launch, Integris had offices in New Jersey, Maryland, Minnesota, Michigan, Colorado, Georgia and Texas.

In December 2024, OMERS Private Equity, the private equity arm of the Ontario Municipal Employees Retirement System, announced an agreement to acquire a majority stake in Integris from Frontenac. Frontenac announced in January 2025 that the transaction had closed on December 30, 2024.

In 2025, Glenn Mathis, formerly the company's president and chief operating officer, became chief executive officer, while Bajwa became executive chairman. In March 2026, Integris announced that Bajwa had returned as chief executive officer and that Kevin Blake, former chief executive officer of TechMD, had been appointed president, effective March 16, 2026.

== Acquisitions ==
In January 2022, Integris acquired Iconic IT, a managed service provider with operations in Texas, Kansas, New York, Florida and Colorado. In October 2022, the company acquired Blue Jean Networks and Security7 Networks. Trade publications reported that the acquisitions expanded Integris' managed security, virtual chief information security officer and Cybersecurity Maturity Model Certification capabilities.

In January 2023, Integris acquired CalTech, a managed service provider focused on community banks. The company later established a Financial Institution Division for community banks, credit unions and other financial institutions.

In February 2024, Integris acquired Network People, a managed service provider based in Tampa, Florida. In June 2025, the company acquired TechMD and its security division, 1nteger Security. ChannelE2E described the transaction as Integris' largest acquisition to date and reported that it expanded the company's cybersecurity and managed detection and response capabilities.

In April 2026, Integris announced plans to acquire First Focus, an Australian managed service provider with operations in Australia, New Zealand and the Philippines, subject to regulatory approval. ITPro described the proposed transaction as Integris' first international acquisition. CRN reported that the proposed combination would have about 1,200 employees, while ITPro reported that First Focus employed almost 400 staff and served more than 800 organizations. Integris executives described artificial intelligence as central to the rationale for the acquisition; chief executive Rashaad Bajwa characterized First Focus as one of the leading managed service providers in AI adoption and delivery, and First Focus chief executive Ross Sardi was reported as being set to become chief innovation officer of the combined business.

== Services and operations ==
Integris provides managed IT, cybersecurity, cloud, network connectivity, IT consulting and compliance-related services. The company has service practices focused on financial institutions and law firms.

In December 2025, Integris announced that it had achieved CMMC Level 2 certification. In January 2026, MSSP Alert reported that the company had launched a managed CMMC Level 2 compliance offering in collaboration with IntelliGRC, based on Integris' experience completing CMMC Level 2 certification.

In 2026, CRN reported that Integris had developed an internal AIOps (AI for IT operations) framework that automated aspects of its service delivery, including help-desk ticket routing. According to the reporting, the company developed and validated the framework within its own operations before preparing to extend the related capabilities to clients. By 2026, trade coverage described Integris as a provider of managed AI and IT services.

== Rankings ==
In 2023, Integris ranked first on CRN's Fast Growth 150 list, with CRN reporting a two-year growth rate of 3,627.54 percent. The company has also appeared on Inc. magazine lists of growing private companies.
