= Defense industrial base =

Political science and military industry term

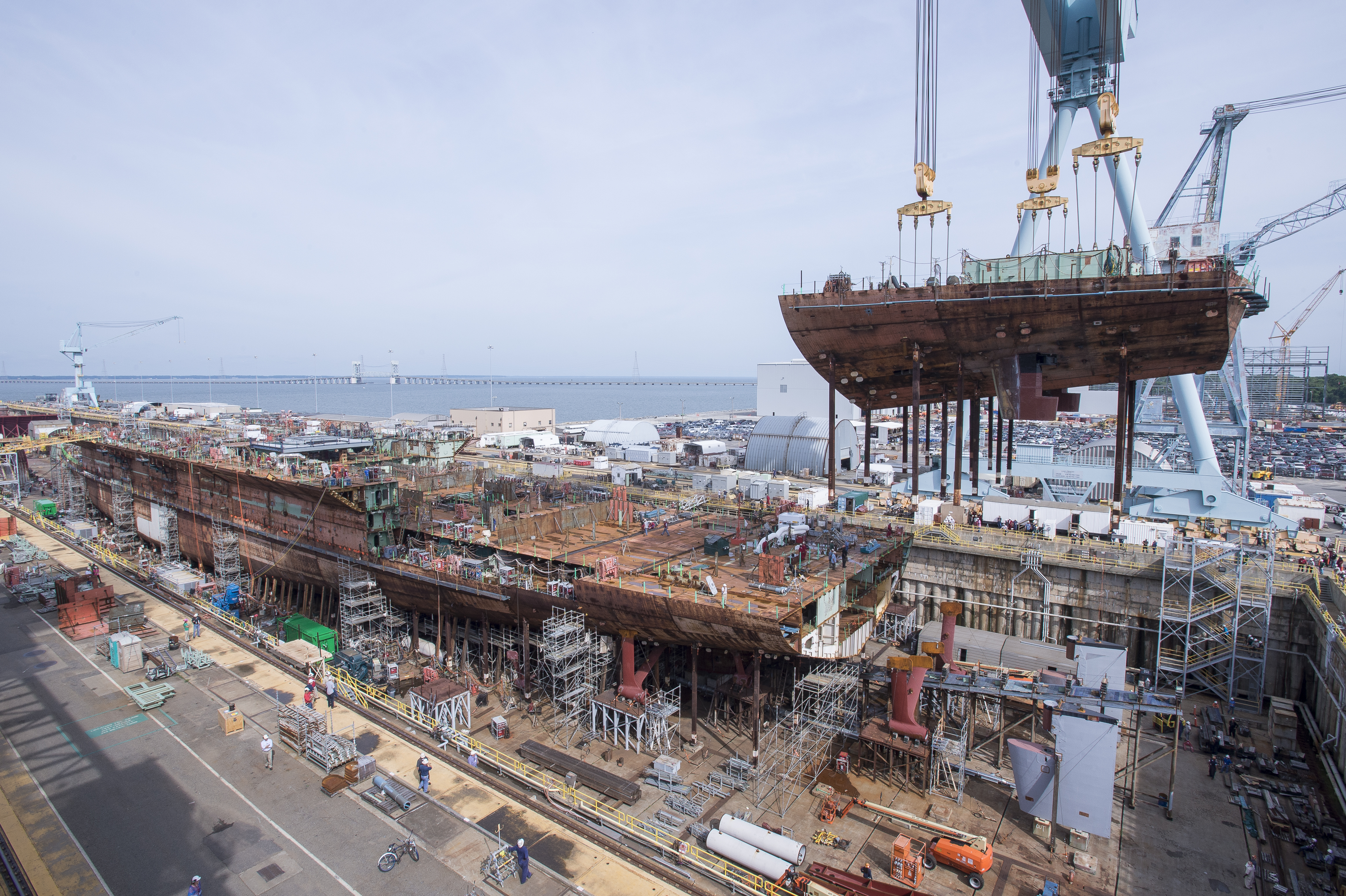
Newport News Shipbuilding is a key part of the American defense industrial base. It is the sole plant for construction of aircraft carriers and one of only two providers of Naval submarines.

A defense industrial base (DIB) is the network of organizations, facilities, and resources that provides a government with materials, products, and services for defense purposes, especially the supply of its military forces. It may include both public and private actors, including some entities that may not exclusively engage in defense-related production, and is often defined in geographical or national terms. It may also be divided according to the kinds of weapons and equipment produced. As a concept, the DIB is closely related to the notion of the military–industrial complex, and is often discussed as a foundational element of national power.

== United States ==
The U.S. defense industrial base has attracted particular attention from policymakers, analysts, academics, and other commentators. Although the country has in some sense possessed a DIB since the Revolutionary War, the modern industrial base – in the form of a large, permanent network of defense-oriented industrial facilities, primarily owned and operated by private firms and maintained during peacetime – dates from the early Cold War. After significant expansion between the late 1940s and the late 1980s, the U.S. DIB experienced a period of contraction and consolidation associated with the reduction of defense spending following the dissolution of the Soviet Union. Since the early 2010s – and especially following Russia's 2022 invasion of Ukraine – the U.S. government has increased the resourcing of the DIB, and production output for the sector as a whole appears to have risen correspondingly. Whether the DIB is appropriately sized, structured, and tasked is subject of considerable debate within the United States.

U.S. media reports have stated that the Pentagon has held preliminary discussions with major American manufacturers, including General Motors and Ford Motor Company, as well as GE Aerospace and Oshkosh Corporation, regarding the potential expansion of their role in producing military equipment and munitions. The initiative is part of broader efforts to strengthen the U.S. defense industrial base amid increased demand driven by ongoing conflicts, including the wars in Ukraine and Iran.

== See also ==
- Military–industrial complex
- Arms industry
- List of countries with highest military expenditures
