= List of countries by past military expenditure =

Military expenditure of the world from 1950 to 2022 in constant 2021 US$ billions

This is a list of countries by past military expenditure, starting 1987.

== Methodology ==
Figures for the tables below are provided by the Stockholm International Peace Research Institute (SIPRI) database. They are presented in millions of United States dollars in current prices, converted at the exchange rate for the given year. If there is no data for a particular year, a cell is left blank. Although the database includes statistics for over 150 countries, per SIPRI's Terms and Condition permission is needed to directly reproduce more than 10% of the database. The last column of each table shows the compound annual growth rate (CAGR).

== 1987–1989 ==
* indicates "Military of COUNTRY" links.

Country	1987	1988	1989	CAGR %
Australia *	5,057	5,836	6,300	11.62
Brazil *	4,324	5,874	8,761	42.34
Canada *	8,694	9,897	10,747	11.18
China *			11,403	-
France *	29,280	30,327	29,666	0.66
West Germany *	32,650	33,569	32,142	-0.78
India *	10,877	11,346	10,590	-1.33
Iran *	15,263	18,889	16,302	3.35
Israel *	5,996	7,000	5,551	-3.78
Italy *	15,653	17,404	17,676	6.27
Japan *	23,642	28,216	27,966	8.76
Poland *	1,765	1,784	1,494	-8.00
Saudi Arabia *	14,460	13,335	12,750	-6.10
South Korea *	6,041	7,732	9,469	25.20
Spain *	7,922	8,900	9,303	8.37
Soviet Union *	225,021	246,011	218,760	-1.40
Turkey *	2,890	2,664	3,374	8.05
United Kingdom *	31,232	34,304	33,499	3.57
United States *	304,087	309,661	321,867	2.88

== 1990–1999 ==
* indicates "Military of COUNTRY" links.

Country	1990	1991	1992	1993	1994	1995	1996	1997	1998	1999	CAGR %
Australia *	6,704	7,024	6,882	6,734	7,460	7,666	8,203	7,937	7,180	7,770	1.65
Brazil *	9,236	6,695	4,994	7,100	10,591	14,319	14,073	13,934	14,357	9,867	0.74
Canada *	11,415	11,339	10,789	10,269	9,577	9,177	8,616	7,945	7,749	8,211	-3.59
China *	10,085	9,954	12,420	12,570	10,051	12,606	14,563	16,105	17,528	21,027	8.51
France *	35,774	35,869	37,902	35,775	37,289	40,124	38,978	34,698	33,634	32,673	-1.00
Germany *	40,477	37,797	40,139	35,595	34,749	39,367	37,293	31,772	31,704	31,185	-2.86
India *	10,537	8,622	8,083	8,254	8,881	9,754	9,905	11,465	11,921	13,096	2.45
Israel *	6,529	9,338	7,313	7,753	7,772	7,946	8,499	8,581	8,096	7,653	1.78
Italy *	20,735	21,586	22,177	18,242	18,063	17,186	20,793	20,156	20,825	21,016	0.15
Japan *	28,800	32,785	35,999	41,354	45,286	49,962	44,047	40,047	37,849	43,123	4.59
Russia *				7,767	13,548	12,742	15,826	17,557	7,956	6,469	-3.00
Saudi Arabia *	16,355	16,355	15,360	16,451	14,280	13,200	13,340	18,127	20,862	18,320	1.27
South Korea *	10,111	10,957	11,615	12,377	13,519	16,085	16,409	14,848	10,458	12,095	2.01
Spain *	11,695	11,680	12,250	10,042	10,093	11,440	11,294	9,866	10,333	11,114	-0.56
Soviet Union *	219,114										
Turkey *	5,315	5,671	6,158	7,075	5,293	6,606	7,512	7,729	8,781	9,952	7.22
United Kingdom *	38,944	42,074	40,775	34,086	34,494	34,248	34,491	35,675	36,866	36,453	-0.73
United States *	325,129	299,373	325,034	316,719	308,084	295,853	287,961	293,168	290,996	298,095	-0.96

== 2000–2009 ==
* indicates "Military of COUNTRY" links.

Country	2000	2001	2002	2003	2004	2005	2006	2007	2008	2009	CAGR %
Australia *	7,274	7,043	7,947	9,927	11,995	13,238	14,240	17,186	18,633	18,960	11.23
Brazil *	11,344	10,930	9,665	8,393	9,780	13,589	16,405	20,486	24,453	25,649	9.49
Canada *	8,299	8,376	8,495	9,958	11,336	12,988	14,810	17,417	19,342	18,936	9.60
China *	22,930	27,875	32,138	35,126	40,353	45,729	55,338	68,011	86,362	105,644	18.50
France *	28,403	27,952	30,578	38,569	44,525	44,442	45,792	50,684	55,366	56,441	7.93
Germany *	26,925	26,232	28,057	33,529	36,353	36,398	36,435	41,116	46,460	46,120	6.16
India *	14,228	14,601	14,750	16,334	20,239	23,072	23,952	28,255	33,002	38,722	11.77
Israel *	8,327	8,504	7,982	8,225	8,605	8,922	9,315	11,382	13,804	12,754	4.85
Italy *	19,879	19,519	21,610	26,824	30,261	29,738	29,633	31,982	36,840	34,054	6.16
Japan *	45,510	40,758	39,334	42,486	45,340	44,301	41,553	40,530	46,361	51,465	1.38
Russia *	9,228	11,683	13,944	16,974	20,995	27,337	34,518	43,535	56,184	51,532	21.06
Saudi Arabia *	19,964	21,027	18,502	18,747	20,910	25,392	29,581	35,470	38,223	41,267	8.40
South Korea *	13,801	12,942	14,102	15,847	17,830	22,160	25,177	27,726	26,072	24,576	6.62
Spain *	10,274	10,222	10,271	12,881	15,262	15,998	17,252	20,066	22,228	20,178	7.79
Turkey *	9,994	7,216	9,050	10,278	10,921	12,081	13,363	14,988	16,810	16,048	5.40
United Arab Emirates *	5,876	5,789	5,354	5,835	6,817	6,604	7,165	8,461	11,572	13,836	9.98
United Kingdom *	35,255	35,332	39,660	46,943	53,970	55,152	57,483	65,986	65,619	57,915	5.67
United States *	320,086	331,806	378,463	440,532	492,999	533,203	558,335	589,586	656,756	705,917	9.19

== 2010–2019 ==
* indicates "Military of COUNTRY" links.

Country	2010	2011	2012	2013	2014	2015	2016	2017	2018	2019	CAGR %
Australia *	23,218	26,597	26,217	24,825	25,784	24,046	26,383	27,691	26,840	25,912	1.23
Brazil *	34,003	36,936	33,987	32,876	32,660	24,618	24,225	29,283	28,177	26,946	-2.55
Canada *	19,361	21,394	20,452	18,516	17,854	17,938	17,783	22,270	22,729	22,198	1.53
China *	115,712	137,967	157,390	179,880	200,772	214,471	216,404	228,466	253,492	261,082	9.46
France *	52,044	54,121	50,217	52,001	53,135	45,647	47,371	49,196	51,410	50,119	-0.42
Germany *	44,853	46,766	44,470	44,866	44,216	37,020	39,725	42,366	46,512	49,277	1.05
India *	46,090	49,634	47,217	47,404	50,914	51,296	56,638	64,559	66,258	71,125	4.94
Israel	13,875	15,163	14,601	16,325	17,810	16,517	17,488	19,434	19,759	20,465	4.41
Italy *	32,021	33,829	29,781	29,957	27,701	22,181	25,033	26,448	27,808	26,790	-1.96
Japan *	54,655	60,762	60,012	49,024	46,881	42,106	46,472	45,387	46,618	47,609	-1.52
Russia *	58,720	70,238	81,469	88,353	84,697	66,418	69,245	66,527	61,388	65,103	1.15
Saudi Arabia *	45,245	48,531	56,498	67,020	80,726	87,186	63,673	70,400	74,400	61,867	3.54
South Korea *	28,175	30,992	31,952	34,137	37,552	36,571	36,885	39,171	43,070	43,891	5.05
Spain *	19,711	19,695	18,861	17,243	17,179	15,189	14,015	16,044	17,823	17,177	-1.52
Turkey *	17,650	17,006	17,694	18,428	17,577	15,669	17,828	17,823	19,649	20,448	1.65
United Arab Emirates *	17,505	19,182	19,024	23,561	22,755	-	-	-	-	-	-
United Kingdom *	58,083	60,270	58,496	56,862	59,183	53,862	48,119	46,433	49,892	48,650	-1.95
United States *	738,005	752,288	725,205	679,229	647,789	633,830	639,856	646,753	682,491	731,751	-0.09

== 2020–2025 ==
* indicates "Military of COUNTRY" links.

Country	2020	2021	2022	2023	2024	2025	CAGR %
Algeria *	9,708	9,112	9,146	18,264	21,811	25,439	21.25
Australia *	27,301	32,718	32,445	32,388	34,231	35,327	5.29
Brazil *	19,591	19,187	20,542	21,788	20,964	23,950	4.10
Canada *	23,458	24,699	25,123	28,878	30,618	37,494	9.83
China *	258,020	286,065	291,569	296,256	311,900	335,524	5.39
France *	53,532	58,742	54,744	59,541	63,575	68,008	4.90
Germany *	53,428	56,520	56,126	68,585	86,148	113,586	16.28
United Kingdom *	58,332	65,149	64,016	73,609	89,815	88,977	8.81
India *	72,815	76,254	79,887	82,262	85,597	92,057	4.80
Israel *	21,050	23,597	22,773	27,103	45,921	48,281	18.06
Italy *	31,645	35,039	33,664	35,508	37,850	48,144	8.75
Japan *	51,388	53,616	43,144	48,096	54,245	62,158	3.88
Mexico *	8,045	8,681	10,057	11,846	20,595	13,648	11.15
Netherlands *	13,086	14,396	13,632	16,625	23,577	28,944	17.21
Poland *	13,712	15,280	15,335	26,459	34,460	46,760	27.81
Russia *	61,884	65,918	104,403	109,204	149,402	190,417	25.21
Saudi Arabia *	64,558	63,195	70,920	77,765	80,331	83,181	5.20
South Korea *	46,117	50,874	46,365	47,802	47,605	47,771	0.71
Spain *	17,450	19,970	20,722	24,837	25,200	40,212	18.17
Taiwan *	12,030	13,933	15,261	16,345	15,233	18,188	8.62
Turkey *	15,815	15,240	15,047	19,233	25,012	29,987	13.65
Ukraine *	6,842	6,843	41,538	65,297	64,768	84,109	65.17
United States *	778,397	806,230	860,692	916,015	1,004,901	954,387	4.16

== See also ==
- Military budget
- List of countries with highest military expenditures
- List of countries with highest military expenditure per capita
