= Military budget =

Financial resources dedicated by a state for purposes of national defense

Military spending by country

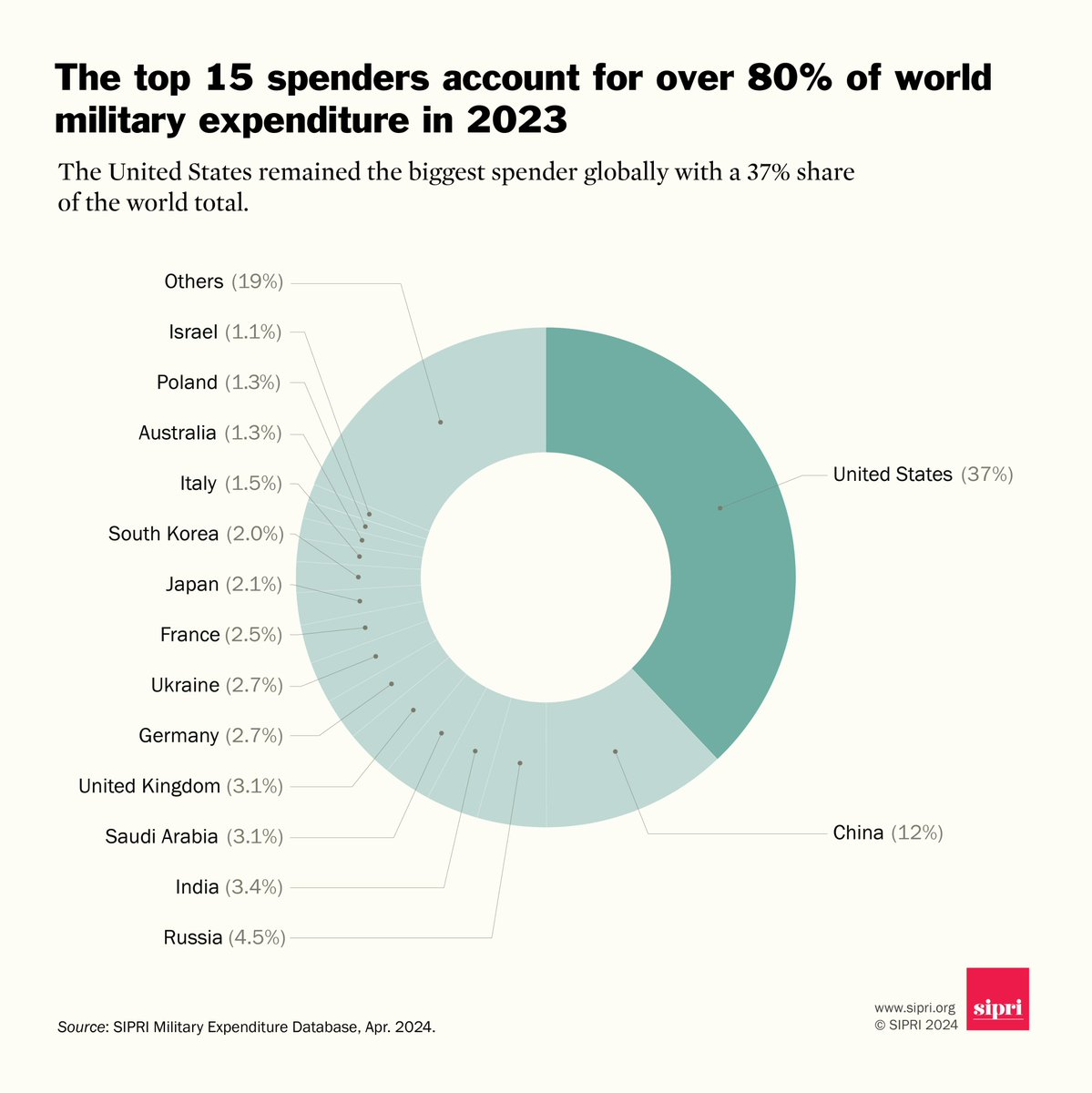
Global military expenditure in 2023

A military budget (or military expenditure), also known as a defense budget, is the amount of financial resources dedicated by a state to raising and maintaining an armed forces or other methods essential for defense purposes.

== Financing militaries ==
Military budgets often reflect how strongly a country perceives the likelihood of threats against it, or the amount of aggression it wishes to conjure. It also gives an idea of how much financing should be provided for the upcoming fiscal year. The size of a budget also reflects the country's ability to fund military activities. Factors include the size of that country's economy, other financial demands on that entity, and the willingness of that entity's government or people to fund such military activity. Generally excluded from military expenditures is spending on internal law enforcement and disabled veteran rehabilitation. The effects of military expenditure on a nation's economy and society, and what determines military expenditure, are notable issues in political science and economics. Generally, some suggest military expenditure is a boost to local economies. Still, others maintain military expenditure is a drag on development.

Among the countries maintaining some of the world's largest military budgets, China, India, France, Germany, Japan, Russia, the United Kingdom and the United States are frequently recognized to be great powers.

In 2024, the United States spent 3.4% of its GDP on its military, while China 1.7%, Russia 7.1%, France 2.1%, United Kingdom 2.3%, India 2.3%, Israel 8.8%, South Korea 2.6% and Germany spent 1.9% of its GDP on defense.

According to the Stockholm International Peace Research Institute, in 2024, total world military expenditure amounted to US$2.718 trillion. It increased 9.4 percent over the previous year. With the Russo-Ukrainian War, European expenditures rose by 17 percent.

Military spending (sipri)

Military spending as a share of gdp (sipri)

military expenditure as a share of government spending

Military spending per armed forces personnel

== Historic expenditure ==
Military expenditure of the world from 1950 to 2022 in constant 2021 US$ billions

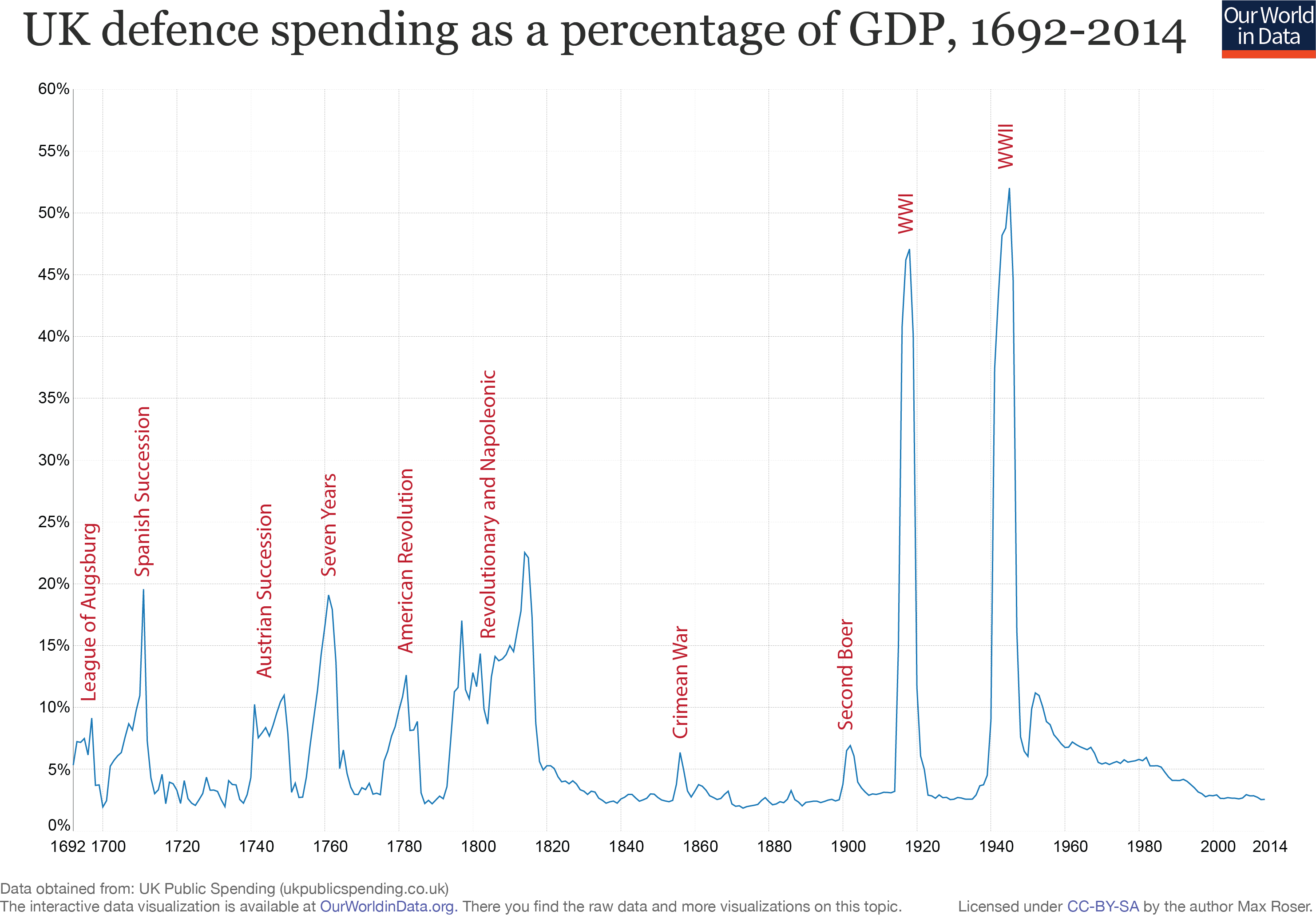
Defense spending in the UK over time

The Saturday Review magazine in February 1898 outlined the levels of military expenditure as a percentage of tax revenue spent by the then great powers for the year 1897:

- United States: 17%. The United States has fluctuated for decades, depending on the conflict of the time. The first spike in defense spending, and in turn taxes, came during the very beginning of the 19th century. During World War I, the United States spent 22% of gross domestic product, while during peacetime, the government spent on as little as 1% Gross Domestic Product (GDP). This changed following World War II as the United States government were experiencing an immense fear of the expansion of communism and therefore heightened security on all fronts. This was supported by Americans as it brought upon them a sense of security and the 3.6% GDP they were contributing to was a large decrease from the whopping amounts of capital being spent during WWII that exceeded 41%, before decreasing to 10% during the Cold War and for about two more decades after, including the Vietnam War, before beginning to decrease in the 1970s down to 6%, then 5.5% in 1979 before beginning to steadily incline once again. After 2001, though, and the September 11 terrorist attacks, defense spending spiked again, peaking at 5.7% in 2010.
- Russian Empire: 21%
- French Third Republic: 39%
- British Empire: 39%
- German Empire: 43%
- Empire of Japan: 55%

== See also ==
- List of countries with highest military expenditures
- List of countries by past military expenditure
- List of countries with highest military expenditure per capita
- Arms industry
- History of military technology
- Military–industrial complex
- List of countries by Global Militarization Index
- List of countries in Europe by military expenditures
