= First Focus =

Australian Managed Service Provider

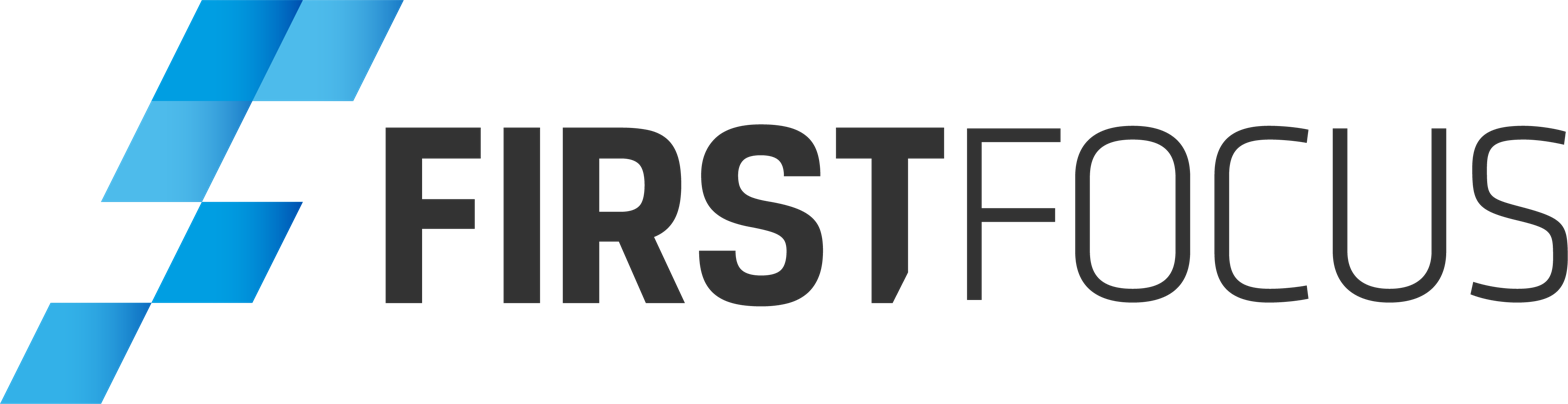
- First Focus Company Logo
- Type: Private
- Industry: IT Managed Services
- Founded: 2003
- Headquarters: Sydney, Australia
- Number of locations: Sydney, Melbourne, Brisbane, Perth, Adelaide, Canberra, Gold Coast, Auckland, Christchurch, Nelson, and Manila
- Key people: Ross Sardi (CEO); Peter Paddon (Owner)
- Services: Managed IT Services, IT Support, Artificial Intelligence, Automation, Cybersecurity, Cloud Services, Software Development, IT Consulting, Microsoft SharePoint, Unified Communications, and Connectivity.
- Number of employees: 350+ (2026)
- Website: firstfocus.com.au

First Focus is an Australian managed service provider (MSP) founded in 2003 and headquartered in Sydney. The company provides managed IT services to businesses in Australia, New Zealand, and internationally.

As of 2026, First Focus employs over 350 staff across offices in Australia, New Zealand, the Philippines, Ireland, and South Africa. The company has been described by industry publication, Channel Insider, as "one of the largest MSPs in Australia" and has won the "#1 MSP in Australia" award by cloudtango for 9 consecutive years.

In April 2026, Integris IT, a Cranbury, New Jersey based managed services provider (MSP) announced its intention to acquire First Focus to create "the world's largest SMB-focused" MSP with about 1,200 employees.

== Acquisitions ==
First Focus was established in 2003 as an IT managed services provider. The company grew organically for its first eleven years, completing its first acquisition in 2014. Following this single acquisition, First Focus returned to organic growth until 2021.

In 2021, First Focus began acquiring other companies. The company's acquisition activity increased in 2023, when it completed six acquisitions including Brisbane-based eStorm, enterprise-focused Ordyss, EnactMSP, communications specialist Flexnet, networking company The Specializt, and Melbourne-based Rock IT.

In 2024, First Focus increased acquisition activity with four major purchases. In February, the company acquired Adelaide-based Enee, followed by Lettscom in July. In November, First Focus purchased Melbourne-based Section Group to expand into website design and digital marketing services. In December, the company acquired Brisbane-based Xari Group, strengthening its security and disaster recovery capabilities.

In 2025, First Focus made further acquisitions that expanded its geographic reach and service capabilities. In February, it acquired South Australia-based Tie Networks, expanding into unified communications solutions. In October, it acquired Gold Coast-based Tech Help Direct, adding Apple-focused expertise and establishing its first office on the Gold Coast. In November, it acquired Melbourne-based Red IT, strengthening its presence in Melbourne.

In March 2026, First Focus acquired New Zealand-based CNX, expanding its service delivery capability in New Zealand, particularly in the South Island through CNX's operations in Nelson and Christchurch.

== Business model and operations ==
First Focus operates as a managed service provider, providing IT infrastructure management and support services to business clients. The company has expanded its service offerings through acquisitions, which have added cloud transformation, cybersecurity, and virtual chief information officer services to its portfolio.

In 2024, the company acquired Section Group, expanding its operations in Victoria and adding website design and digital marketing services. The acquisition of Tie Networks added unified communications capabilities. According to Channel Insider, the Section Group acquisition allows the company to serve smaller businesses seeking consolidated IT services.

First Focus holds Microsoft partner status and has published case studies of its cloud transformation projects, including work with Energy Action. Company representatives have provided commentary on artificial intelligence strategy implementation in industry publications.

== Awards & Recognition ==
First Focus has received recognition from various industry publications and directories.

First Focus was ranked the number one Managed Service Provider in Australia and New Zealand by the directory Cloudtango for nine consecutive years (2018–2026). The ranking is based on technical analysis, cybersecurity capabilities, and customer satisfaction indices.

The CRN Fast50 recognises the fastest-growing IT companies in Australia based on year-on-year revenue growth. First Focus appeared on the list in 2013, 2021 (Ranked #28), and placed in the Techpartner.news (formerly known as CRN Australia) Top 5 in 2025.

Since 2018, the company has been listed as a leading Managed Service Provider in the Channel Futures MSP 501 global rankings.

== Services ==
First Focus provides managed IT services to business clients in Australia and New Zealand. The company's stated target market is businesses with 20 to 200 employees operating across multiple locations.

=== IT Services ===
First Focus offers managed IT services, IT support services, managed cloud services, and managed security services. Its security services include offerings aligned with the Australian Signals Directorate's Essential Eight maturity model.

The company offers AI consulting and implementation services focused on tools such as Microsoft Copilot and ChatGPT. According to the company, First Focus is an OpenAI Services Partner and supports organisations in Australia and New Zealand with the implementation and adoption of ChatGPT Business.

In 2025, First Focus introduced CORE (described as "The Future of Managed IT Services"), a service combining AI implementation, business process automation, Essential Eight-aligned cybersecurity, data governance, modern workplace management, and IT support. The service is structured with tiered pricing levels and marketed towards businesses with 20-200 employees. CORE includes service requests under four hours as part of the base offering and emphasises continuous capability development rather than project-based implementations.

First Focus also provides IT consulting, cloud migration services, business continuity planning, SharePoint services, software development, connectivity services, unified communications solutions, business automation services, and data services. Its data services include data warehousing, data engineering, data governance, and data visualisation.

=== Service delivery model ===
First Focus organises technical support using a pod-based structure, where dedicated teams are assigned to specific groups of clients rather than operating from a shared service desk pool. This model is designed to provide service consistency, with clients interacting with the same support staff who develop familiarity with their IT systems.

The support pods serve between 30 and 50 clients. These pods consist of a general manager, 3-4 technical account managers, a service delivery lead, a support team lead, 5 subject matter experts, 10 technicians, and a technical lead. The pod management team is responsible for call and ticket handling, ticket resolution, customer satisfaction, client documentation, and problem management for their assigned clients.

The company operates a client portal called F-Connect for ticket management and IT environment monitoring.

== Radical Cup Sponsorship ==
First Focus is the title sponsor for the Motorsport Australia, Radical Cup Australia. In 2024 the Series became known as the First Focus Radical Cup Australia.

First Focus owner, Peter Paddon, has been a registered driver in the Radical Cup Australia since 2013 . In 2024, First Focus became title sponsors of the cup, with the event becoming known as the First Focus Radical Cup Australia. The First Focus branded series receives broadcast coverage through the Seven Network, Fox Sports and Kayo Sports, as part of the SRO Motorsports Australia platform.
