= List of countries with highest military expenditure per capita =

This is a list of countries by military expenditure per capita, the amount spent by a nation on its military per capita in a given year. This list is sourced from the Stockholm International Peace Research Institute (SIPRI) for the year 2020.

As of 2021, the top five per capita spenders are Qatar (~$3955), Israel (~$2770), United States (~$2405), Kuwait (~$2085) and Singapore (~$1885). All five countries have increased their spending since the previous year (2020).

The UAE, for which recent data is not available, has also spent historically large amounts of money on the military on a per capita basis. The UAE had a per capita spending of $2470 per person back in 2014, making it the second highest spender in that year just after Saudi Arabia, but by 2020 that number had fallen to $2204.

== Military expenditure per capita spending ==
SIPRI's estimate of the top 10 countries by per capita military expenditure, US dollars per person (2023).
Country name	$/cap	Accuracy
Israel	2997,1	Precise
United States	2694,2	Precise
Singapore	2194,6	Precise
Saudi Arabia	2051,9	Estimate
Kuwait	1799,3	Precise
Ukraine	1762,2	Estimate
Norway	1583,6	Precise
Denmark	1377,9	Precise
Finland	1325,2	Precise
Oman	1260,1	Estimate

In the table below, numbers are in USD. "DNE" means the country did not exist at the time or was not independent, and "—" means that the data are unavailable.

2019 SIPRI estimates
Country	1988	1989	1990	1991	1992	1993	1994	1995	1996	1997	1998	1999	2000	2001	2002	2003	2004	2005	2006	2007	2008	2009	2010	2011	2012	2013	2014	2015	2016	2017	2018	2019
Algeria	42.1	34.0	35.1	21.4	39.0	46.2	47.3	42.9	49.6	58.9	63.3	59.6	60.6	66.5	65.9	68.4	85.7	88.2	92.0	115.5	148.9	149.4	157.6	236.0	249.5	266.4	249.8	262.1	252.0	243.4	226.9	239.3
Libya	—N/a									244.6	277.8	218.6	202.6	150.6	81.8	96.3	120.0	119.2	104.4	107.0	181.6	—N/a			475.3	627.3	590.3	—N/a				
Morocco	38.4	40.7	43.1	45.5	47.8	47.9	51.4	53.3	52.8	50.5	51.4	42.4	29.8	50.5	50.1	61.1	64.3	66.7	69.3	77.3	93.4	95.7	97.7	102.0	102.4	120.6	118.4	94.3	94.7	97.3	102.6	102.0
Tunisia	29.6	29.0	30.1	30.9	33.6	31.4	33.1	37.6	42.9	38.1	38.5	37.1	34.2	34.3	35.0	41.0	44.4	46.4	48.7	47.6	55.6	53.7	53.7	66.6	62.8	69.3	82.1	87.6	87.4	75.1	73.0	85.6
Angola	132.8	170.1	147.8	84.2	62.7	135.7	—N/a	16.8	11.1	30.7	11.1	67.2	35.6	23.9	25.0	37.0	43.6	70.2	97.8	97.2	145.8	147.1	149.9	150.3	165.1	234.1	254.1	129.4	95.8	102.7	64.4	46.2
Benin	7.9	5.9	6.6	—N/a								2.7	2.1	1.9	3.6	4.6	5.4	5.6	5.7	—N/a	7.4	—N/a			8.0	8.6	9.0	8.6	7.3	10.4	7.9	5.8
Botswana	78.1	82.6	121.4	129.9	130.5	132.7	118.8	112.9	93.4	104.2	114.9	105.3	112.4	125.6	131.1	173.6	177.9	157.8	148.7	163.4	173.5	169.0	175.5	180.3	160.3	148.6	165.8	180.9	238.2	236.9	221.0	223.9
Burkina Faso	6.8	7.8	9.6	7.7	7.6	6.3	3.1	3.7	3.6	3.6	3.6	3.7	3.2	3.1	3.5	4.0	5.0	5.5	5.3	7.6	8.0	8.4	7.9	8.6	8.9	9.7	10.1	8.2	8.0	10.0	15.5	17.6
Burundi	6.6	7.1	7.3	7.7	6.9	6.3	7.1	7.0	8.4	10.1	9.5	8.1	6.6	8.2	6.7	6.3	6.3	6.7	5.9	5.9	5.4	—N/a			6.4	6.4	6.3	6.5	6.3	5.9	5.9	5.6
Cameroon	13.9	12.9	15.3	14.7	14.7	13.1	7.1	8.4	8.4	8.3	9.3	9.6	7.9	7.8	8.9	11.2	12.8	12.6	14.1	15.8	18.0	17.3	17.4	16.6	16.5	17.8	17.7	15.2	16.2	16.6	17.0	16.3
Cape Verde	15.6	—N/a			10.0	7.5	9.1	16.1	10.8	10.1	10.9	11.9	15.9	10.6	10.2	12.9	14.1	15.3	14.9	16.7	22.4	17.3	16.7	19.6	19.3	19.2	19.4	17.0	19.1	17.4	19.7	17.7
Central African Rep.	—N/a			7.5	7.8	6.3	3.4	4.0	3.7	—N/a					2.8	3.9	3.8	3.8	—N/a	4.6	7.4	8.3	11.8	—N/a						6.0	6.5	6.8
Chad	13.9	9.8	5.8	—N/a	5.6	6.0	3.3	2.9	3.4	2.2	2.1	2.6	2.6	3.0	3.8	4.4	5.2	5.5	21.3	36.0	54.7	63.9	51.5	49.3	—N/a	54.9	28.7	15.7	21.3	14.6	16.4	14.7
Congo, Republic of	—N/a				50.4	42.8	—N/a						16.9	21.4	27.5	35.4	27.9	33.8	43.4	51.8	—N/a	51.1	—N/a		79.4	148.8	—N/a	100.7	72.8	55.7	55.7	
Congo, Dem. Rep.	6.6	2.0	1.3	1.2	2.3	12.1	—N/a		2.1	1.9	0.6	3.3	2.8	—N/a		1.5	2.6	3.0	3.6	3.5	2.6	2.0	2.8	3.6	4.8	5.2	4.6	6.4	5.0	3.6	3.5	4.1
Côte d’Ivoire	11.5	11.3	12.1	11.7	12.2	11.2	6.1	—N/a	7.0	6.2	—N/a					12.1	14.0	13.6	14.3	16.9	18.8	20.9	18.9	17.0	18.9	19.5	23.0	24.5	25.3	20.5	24.2	20.8
Djibouti	58.7	55.1	52.7	52.4	54.7	50.2	49.3	47.0	38.1	40.2	39.2	38.3	36.3	35.5	44.5	55.0	48.4	57.3	62.3	42.9	44.4	—N/a										
Equatorial Guinea	—N/a						5.0	6.9	—N/a											238.9	340.1	412.5	—N/a				148.4	—N/a	114.6	107.9	114.2	—N/a
Eritrea	DNE					48.1	36.2	56.7	69.3	42.3	119.2	122.0	100.6	70.1	60.8	69.8	—N/a															
Ethiopia	13.7	16.9	16.4	10.7	5.0	3.1	2.7	2.1	2.1	3.7	7.3	10.9	9.3	5.1	4.1	3.9	4.2	4.5	4.4	4.5	4.7	4.0	3.5	3.7	4.0	3.6	4.2	4.4	4.7	4.7	4.7	4.9
Gabon	—N/a												74.3	71.6	73.5	82.1	92.4	84.9	91.1	—N/a			165.5	157.9	159.0	155.3	110.5	87.5	101.0	129.5	123.3	122.8
Gambia	2.5	3.0	3.6	4.0	3.4	2.4	2.1	2.6	3.4	3.5	3.3	2.8	2.5	1.8	1.6	1.4	1.3	1.9	1.8	2.8	10.2	4.1	—N/a		5.9	5.3	7.2	6.8	—N/a		5.0	6.2
Ghana	1.6	1.6	1.9	2.7	2.7	2.5	2.3	2.9	2.5	2.5	3.1	3.2	2.6	1.6	1.8	2.6	2.6	2.9	3.4	5.5	4.8	4.9	4.9	9.2	13.0	9.6	9.3	6.8	5.7	6.5	7.3	7.7
Guinea	—N/a			11.0	8.3	6.4	6.5	—N/a		5.8	5.7	6.9	5.6	10.4	11.4	9.6	9.1	—N/a							15.9	18.1	17.7	19.4	13.8	15.1	15.9	15.3
Guinea-Bissau	—N/a	4.6	—N/a				1.9	2.0	1.7	1.6	2.5	—N/a	7.9	5.0	5.1	5.8	—N/a	9.0	—N/a			9.3	11.3	11.2	15.3	13.2	12.7	9.8	8.8	10.4	—N/a	
Kenya	11.3	10.0	10.4	7.8	6.2	4.0	4.4	5.4	6.0	6.0	5.7	4.9	5.2	5.9	6.3	7.1	7.3	8.6	10.0	12.8	14.6	14.1	14.8	15.0	18.9	18.9	17.5	17.6	19.0	20.2	21.7	21.8
Lesotho	10.4	13.6	14.2	12.8	13.6	12.2	13.9	18.1	14.7	14.6	13.9	16.9	15.0	11.5	9.6	13.6	15.6	16.8	17.7	20.0	13.8	23.8	35.4	29.0	26.4	23.6	23.3	21.4	20.0	25.1	24.2	21.1
Liberia	—N/a																1.0	2.5	1.2	1.0	1.1	1.9	2.2	3.3	3.7	3.6	3.3	3.3	3.2	2.8	2.8	3.4
Madagascar	3.0	2.7	3.3	2.9	1.9	3.0	2.1	2.0	3.6	3.7	3.4	2.9	3.0	4.0	3.4	4.2	3.1	2.9	2.9	4.2	5.2	3.5	2.7	3.3	3.1	3.1	3.0	2.4	2.4	2.6	2.8	2.8
Malawi	2.3	2.5	2.6	2.5	2.6	2.6	1.8	1.1	2.0	2.6	1.4	1.3	1.1	1.1	1.3	1.1	1.8	3.0	2.4	2.5	3.2	4.2	3.4	3.5	3.0	4.0	3.0	2.4	2.1	2.7	3.2	3.7
Mali	5.9	5.6	6.2	—N/a		4.9	3.2	4.2	4.0	4.0	4.0	4.1	4.0	4.0	4.2	5.6	6.3	6.8	7.3	8.1	10.1	9.9	9.8	10.4	9.3	9.4	12.9	17.7	20.2	24.9	25.3	24.1
Mauritania	22.3	19.6	19.8	18.9	18.4	13.7	13.1	13.8	16.0	17.1	10.3	12.5	14.4	19.2	13.1	21.9	—N/a	22.0	26.3	—N/a	37.4	33.8	—N/a		38.4	37.8	36.8	32.9	32.7	33.6	36.1	35.9
Mauritius	4.5	6.1	8.7	9.8	10.6	9.8	10.6	11.9	11.4	8.5	7.3	7.7	7.9	7.5	7.9	9.0	9.0	8.9	8.8	9.4	12.6	12.3	11.9	14.0	13.3	18.5	15.7	13.6	17.4	17.9	18.2	17.8
Mozambique	5.0	6.2	6.5	5.4	4.3	4.1	4.9	2.2	2.3	2.6	2.9	3.3	3.1	2.8	2.9	3.1	3.9	3.0	2.7	3.2	3.8	3.7	4.2	4.9	5.6	6.2	6.6	5.0	4.0	4.5	5.7	4.5
Namibia	DNE		—N/a	98.1	82.1	45.1	35.8	41.9	40.0	49.3	45.6	60.0	51.5	53.1	47.5	68.9	87.5	99.1	101.2	113.7	130.3	143.9	187.1	205.7	187.8	174.6	236.4	223.9	180.4	189.8	186.1	164.5
Niger	—N/a						1.9	1.9	1.8	1.7	2.1	2.2	1.8	2.1	1.7	1.9	2.4	2.4	—N/a		3.5	3.3	4.1	4.9	8.4	5.7	7.6	—N/a	8.0	9.3	10.2	7.4
Nigeria	3.0	1.8	2.9	2.5	1.7	2.8	3.0	5.9	6.3	7.2	9.9	4.1	3.0	4.6	7.0	4.5	4.7	4.9	5.4	6.6	10.8	9.7	12.6	14.6	13.9	14.1	13.4	11.4	9.3	8.5	10.4	9.3
Rwanda	5.2	5.7	13.1	14.9	13.2	14.3	6.8	9.7	12.2	12.0	12.5	10.8	7.7	6.9	6.1	5.3	4.7	5.1	6.0	6.0	7.1	7.7	7.4	7.3	7.6	7.6	8.2	9.1	9.2	9.7	9.7	9.6
Senegal	14.9	13.6	15.7	14.2	13.7	14.6	7.8	9.3	9.0	7.8	8.0	8.2	6.4	6.9	7.2	9.2	9.9	11.2	13.1	16.5	18.1	17.4	15.4	17.7	14.7	17.2	16.9	14.7	20.3	19.8	24.3	21.4
Seychelles	173.7	186.0	210.3	231.8	282.1	174.8	157.6	151.2	135.9	145.5	133.3	138.8	127.5	134.3	139.2	142.6	182.3	166.1	160.5	168.5	123.0	95.3	78.4	94.8	107.2	147.4	328.1	190.6	229.0	223.2	233.1	243.3
Sierra Leone	2.2	3.4	2.9	5.3	6.1	5.4	6.1	5.8	4.3	2.2	—N/a		5.1	6.3	5.5	5.5	4.2	4.2	4.8	4.9	3.9	4.2	3.9	3.9	4.4	4.6	7.0	5.5	5.1	5.3	3.9	3.3
Somalia	—N/a																								2.0	4.5	3.4	3.4	4.2	5.2	5.1	
South Africa	121.5	116.4	118.6	102.7	95.1	82.1	85.8	79.5	61.4	56.2	43.6	39.2	42.1	39.5	38.3	55.1	65.5	74.5	72.3	71.8	66.0	71.2	81.8	88.3	85.0	76.7	71.4	63.0	56.4	63.8	63.5	59.2
South Sudan	DNE																		69.7	70.7	102.6	66.7	68.5	107.1	97.7	94.8	123.3	107.5	12.5	6.6	13.6	7.8
Sudan	19.6	—N/a	58.5	65.4	8.5	11.5	9.7	5.8	4.3	3.8	10.0	16.1	21.5	13.9	16.9	13.5	41.1	37.6	52.0	75.0	97.6	94.1	—N/a					58.6	69.0	107.4	25.1	16.9
Eswatini	11.3	10.9	17.3	18.9	24.2	26.7	28.4	31.0	28.0	26.6	26.3	26.0	24.3	19.4	18.0	31.2	41.6	57.7	56.5	59.3	63.5	71.8	95.8	99.5	84.0	79.2	74.3	66.6	72.3	78.0	79.9	75.8
Tanzania	5.3	4.3	3.5	4.2	3.6	2.1	2.0	2.9	3.3	3.8	4.2	3.9	4.0	4.4	4.0	3.4	3.4	3.6	3.7	4.1	4.6	5.1	6.4	6.7	7.6	9.1	10.2	10.0	10.3	11.2	12.4	13.8
Togo	12.0	11.4	13.4	11.9	12.4	12.4	6.2	7.3	—N/a							5.4	5.8	5.9	—N/a		9.4	8.8	8.9	8.9	9.3	10.4	11.6	9.6	10.9	11.5	13.2	21.1
Uganda	8.7	8.3	6.2	4.1	2.8	3.3	5.3	6.2	6.4	6.4	6.9	7.0	6.0	5.6	5.6	5.9	7.3	7.8	7.6	8.6	10.2	9.3	18.8	18.1	10.2	8.4	8.8	8.0	8.0	8.4	9.6	14.6
Zambia	11.4	21.4	17.3	10.5	11.6	5.9	7.1	6.1	4.1	4.5	—N/a	5.5	—N/a				8.5	11.8	16.9	18.6	21.6	16.7	20.6	22.0	23.9	25.5	28.8	23.5	18.3	20.2	21.8	16.4
Zimbabwe	41.3	40.2	39.9	35.2	27.2	22.5	22.0	23.0	25.3	26.7	26.0	22.3	29.1	24.0	56.6	16.3	21.3	10.9	13.3	—N/a			7.7	15.4	24.3	26.7	27.1	27.3	25.5	23.9	29.1	37.3
Belize	—N/a	23.7	25.4	24.8	27.2	31.0	39.2	38.9	37.3	42.4	—N/a		28.8	29.2	29.8	31.7	34.3	37.7	42.2	46.0	61.0	54.9	47.6	46.7	45.0	51.4	56.4	54.6	58.9	61.1	60.5	59.7
Costa Rica	0.0	0.0	0.0	0.0	0.0	0.0	0.0	0.0	0.0	0.0	0.0	0.0	0.0	0.0	0.0	0.0	0.0	0.0	0.0	0.0	0.0	0.0	0.0	0.0	0.0	0.0	0.0	0.0	0.0	0.0	0.0	0.0
Cuba	—N/a															26.4	5.5	7.0	6.8	7.4	7.9	8.2	8.4	8.3	11.3	10.6	11.1	10.5	10.9	10.8	11.3	—N/a
Dominican Rep.	6.9	7.6	6.7	4.7	8.5	12.7	13.1	10.8	13.5	18.6	19.4	21.0	29.1	35.6	31.1	17.6	17.0	29.9	28.1	29.4	35.3	33.5	36.6	35.5	39.9	38.2	43.0	44.5	46.1	50.7	55.9	57.3
El Salvador	34.9	41.0	31.1	27.2	24.8	21.2	19.7	19.8	19.5	19.5	19.1	19.6	18.7	25.4	27.1	21.1	21.2	22.0	23.4	27.1	28.2	30.8	32.5	35.5	36.0	37.9	37.2	39.2	39.0	40.8	45.9	49.5
Guatemala	16.6	16.8	14.3	12.6	15.8	14.5	15.0	15.2	13.3	12.1	12.6	10.9	13.5	16.5	13.0	14.3	9.0	8.0	9.7	9.9	11.9	10.3	11.6	13.2	14.7	16.0	15.4	15.5	17.5	16.3	15.8	19.6
Haiti	0.3	0.3	0.4	0.4	0.2	0.2	0.2	0.3	—N/a																					0.0	0.0	0.0
Honduras	28.2	28.7	13.5	9.3	—N/a	7.5	—N/a						8.0	9.3	9.2	11.6	8.3	8.4	9.9	12.3	16.6	19.2	20.5	23.6	24.6	33.5	35.1	39.1	39.2	42.3	40.2	41.5
Jamaica	12.9	17.0	16.0	13.1	19.2	17.9	13.6	13.9	16.3	21.2	18.3	17.1	16.4	17.3	21.1	20.2	20.0	21.7	26.4	30.2	47.0	41.1	41.1	47.3	48.4	44.9	42.2	42.8	47.4	49.1	71.4	85.6
Mexico	12.2	14.0	14.4	17.1	21.0	24.0	29.2	17.0	20.2	23.1	23.6	27.2	30.7	32.2	31.2	28.7	27.3	29.5	28.2	38.7	39.1	40.1	42.0	47.5	48.7	54.5	56.2	44.9	43.3	40.6	46.3	51.2
Nicaragua	—N/a		273.7	15.9	10.8	9.0	7.8	7.5	6.7	6.3	5.3	5.4	6.1	5.5	6.7	6.7	6.1	6.3	6.8	7.1	7.5	7.3	7.6	8.7	11.7	12.3	13.3	15.9	13.5	13.6	12.6	12.6
Panama	43.4	42.1	29.6	31.2	30.6	36.2	37.6	35.3	36.2	41.3	35.7	37.6	0.0	0.0	0.0	0.0	0.0	0.0	0.0	0.0	0.0	0.0	0.0	0.0	0.0	0.0	0.0	0.0	0.0	0.0	0.0	0.0
Trinidad & Tobago	—N/a					18.2	19.4	—N/a						11.0	15.3	26.3	58.8	75.4	88.7	95.3	105.8	104.9	107.7	109.3	125.5	156.0	138.6	147.5	157.0	145.8	116.6	119.3
Canada	369.2	395.4	414.5	406.6	382.3	359.7	331.8	314.7	292.5	267.1	258.1	271.0	271.3	271.2	272.5	316.3	356.3	403.8	455.2	528.9	580.2	561.1	565.7	619.4	585.7	524.6	500.6	497.9	488.8	606.3	613.1	593.3
United States	1251.8	1288.9	1289.6	1176.1	1264.8	1220.3	1174.8	1115.7	1073.1	1079.0	1057.5	1070.2	1136.2	1165.8	1317.4	1520.0	1686.3	1807.5	1875.1	1961.3	2164.0	2304.6	2388.3	2414.4	2309.2	2146.7	2032.8	1975.3	1980.9	1989.5	2086.5	2223.7
Argentina	85.1	44.8	62.9	86.4	97.1	99.2	109.1	109.2	95.9	93.7	94.2	94.9	88.6	85.4	29.6	36.1	38.1	43.7	47.0	57.9	69.6	73.7	85.0	98.1	109.3	121.8	116.8	127.3	103.6	124.3	86.6	70.2
Bolivia	14.1	15.1	20.0	20.5	19.8	15.0	18.0	18.5	18.9	22.7	28.2	21.4	20.6	21.5	18.4	19.5	18.6	18.3	19.1	23.2	33.7	35.0	32.6	39.5	48.2	53.5	58.5	52.9	50.1	51.3	54.5	52.0
Brazil	40.9	59.9	62.0	44.1	32.4	45.3	66.4	88.4	85.5	83.3	84.6	57.3	64.9	61.7	53.8	46.2	53.2	73.0	87.2	107.7	127.3	132.3	173.7	187.0	170.5	163.5	161.1	120.4	117.5	140.9	134.5	127.7
Chile	77.8	75.7	77.7	76.9	85.2	92.6	103.5	127.1	130.5	143.4	141.0	134.7	137.1	122.0	113.5	130.5	167.8	191.6	235.7	243.3	277.8	231.1	286.8	330.0	314.1	314.7	287.3	257.7	263.4	290.7	296.1	273.4
Colombia	27.1	26.7	26.9	27.0	32.0	43.6	56.1	71.9	116.5	79.2	88.4	83.3	76.4	81.1	81.9	79.0	96.4	115.2	123.3	154.9	204.5	201.9	230.5	225.7	254.1	268.9	252.2	192.1	180.1	204.8	204.1	200.3
Ecuador	20.3	18.9	19.7	20.0	19.7	25.2	26.0	41.5	35.8	41.8	45.0	23.8	21.0	29.7	38.4	55.3	52.2	69.0	67.6	91.6	113.2	131.9	139.5	161.0	167.4	174.2	174.7	160.2	152.4	146.7	149.2	142.0
Guyana	14.7	8.1	4.8	2.7	4.8	5.9	7.2	7.5	7.3	—N/a			16.9	19.3	22.4	21.9	29.7	24.8	25.7	33.5	40.9	41.5	41.5	43.1	44.4	46.3	51.5	60.5	66.8	76.8	79.9	86.7
Paraguay	44.6	23.9	26.6	45.6	38.1	34.7	34.5	43.3	41.3	33.6	27.3	22.3	20.7	16.8	12.6	11.3	14.7	13.3	18.0	22.1	27.7	27.3	32.7	45.0	50.0	57.0	60.4	57.8	50.6	50.7	55.6	57.2
Peru	34.8	39.9	35.2	31.0	39.4	40.9	46.6	58.2	56.4	46.8	44.5	38.0	34.5	33.7	31.0	32.6	33.4	43.2	45.9	47.0	52.6	64.2	75.1	80.5	96.9	111.0	106.9	108.7	82.0	84.8	82.8	83.8
Uruguay	84.7	96.4	105.6	85.8	116.3	131.8	140.7	162.5	177.3	175.9	174.2	173.6	167.5	157.3	103.5	81.1	84.1	104.6	118.1	124.9	170.0	172.3	224.9	244.8	273.6	308.3	304.2	284.3	288.6	339.2	368.5	331.1
Venezuela	58.6	62.4	37.6	49.0	48.3	61.3	43.8	54.7	32.8	67.5	62.3	59.3	73.9	77.6	42.7	38.7	55.7	100.8	135.2	159.7	204.8	144.7	140.3	123.8	174.2	208.2	51.8	10.7	7.3	15.8	—N/a	
Kazakhstan	DNE				—N/a		6.7	11.2	15.5	15.4	16.0	9.6	9.6	14.9	16.4	21.0	28.0	38.4	51.0	86.6	97.1	79.3	92.4	109.4	130.0	149.8	133.3	116.4	71.8	76.9	85.8	95.2
Kyrgyzstan	DNE				—N/a		2.7	5.9	6.1	6.6	5.5	4.8	5.2	4.5	5.2	6.5	7.4	7.8	9.2	9.8	11.6	12.6	14.2	15.7	19.1	20.8	21.9	19.6	19.0	19.6	20.2	19.3
Tajikistan	DNE				0.2	4.2	2.5	1.0	2.3	3.2	3.8	2.5	1.7	2.0	4.0	5.3	6.8	—N/a			7.3	6.5	7.1	9.3	9.7	—N/a	12.6	11.3	—N/a			
Turkmenistan	DNE				—N/a		19.3	32.2	11.3	24.4	19.8	25.1	—N/a																			
Uzbekistan	DNE				—N/a		3.9	4.9	7.4	9.2	—N/a	10.2	4.7	2.4	1.8	2.1	—N/a															
China	—N/a	9.8	8.6	8.3	10.3	10.3	8.2	10.2	11.6	12.8	13.8	16.4	17.8	21.5	24.6	26.7	30.5	34.5	41.3	50.5	63.8	77.6	84.5	100.2	113.7	129.2	143.5	152.4	153.0	160.8	177.6	182.1
Japan	228.3	225.4	231.3	262.4	287.2	329.0	359.3	395.4	347.8	320.2	297.7	338.7	356.9	319.1	307.6	331.8	353.7	345.2	323.6	315.4	360.7	400.3	425.2	472.9	467.3	382.1	366.0	329.0	363.7	356.0	366.5	375.3
Korea, North	—N/a																													37.8	62.8	—N/a
Korea, South	183.7	222.8	235.6	252.6	264.9	279.2	301.6	355.1	358.7	321.4	224.3	257.3	291.3	271.3	293.8	328.4	367.7	455.0	515.1	565.4	530.1	498.0	568.7	622.5	638.3	681.5	742.0	719.6	723.5	766.6	841.7	856.8
Mongolia	—N/a			50.0	14.7	6.2	7.2	9.3	9.3	8.0	8.5	7.6	10.1	9.6	10.3	9.9	11.1	11.8	15.3	21.8	25.4	14.1	20.2	31.5	40.2	35.9	35.8	33.9	31.5	28.1	30.3	30.9
Taiwan	354.8	401.8	424.9	449.9	482.6	553.7	563.6	537.1	547.5	524.1	425.0	438.2	400.6	361.0	338.3	333.3	347.1	352.8	335.0	355.8	389.3	394.8	392.1	429.7	449.6	425.4	417.3	416.1	409.2	442.7	442.7	438.3
Afghanistan	—N/a																5.1	4.8	5.0	8.1	8.7	8.9	10.2	10.8	7.7	6.7	8.0	5.8	5.3	5.3	5.3	6.0
Bangladesh	3.4	3.8	3.6	3.6	4.0	4.3	4.9	5.4	5.4	5.7	5.7	5.9	5.8	5.4	5.1	5.3	5.6	5.6	5.9	6.7	7.1	8.6	11.0	12.1	12.1	13.4	15.2	18.0	20.5	20.5	22.9	26.7
India	13.5	12.4	12.1	9.7	8.9	8.9	9.4	10.1	10.1	11.5	11.7	13.4	13.5	13.6	13.5	14.7	17.9	20.1	20.6	23.9	27.5	31.8	37.3	39.7	37.3	37.0	39.3	39.2	42.8	48.2	49.0	52.1
Nepal	2.0	2.0	2.0	1.8	1.9	1.8	1.9	1.8	1.8	1.9	1.8	2.0	2.1	2.7	3.5	4.1	5.1	6.2	6.0	6.4	7.0	7.8	9.4	10.5	9.5	10.4	12.2	12.0	13.1	15.8	15.3	15.0
Pakistan	26.8	24.7	26.1	27.7	29.7	28.3	27.6	29.6	27.9	25.3	23.9	22.2	20.9	19.5	21.9	24.3	26.4	28.6	30.3	31.8	30.4	30.1	33.3	37.9	39.9	40.0	44.3	47.6	49.0	55.1	54.3	47.4
Sri Lanka	9.8	7.3	10.8	15.8	18.4	19.8	24.2	41.9	41.8	37.8	39.5	33.8	43.8	35.7	30.0	28.2	31.9	33.0	40.2	53.2	75.6	75.6	75.6	85.9	71.8	77.5	92.1	98.4	82.8	88.3	79.2	78.2
Brunei	729.9	740.2	893.5	922.0	919.0	830.5	904.7	961.7	1077.9	1183.1	921.2	792.2	733.0	640.1	652.2	688.9	554.7	680.9	792.5	861.8	954.1	911.1	1005.4	1055.1	1030.7	1019.0	1288.0	1022.0	960.9	816.8	833.9	957.1
Cambodia	—N/a		3.2	4.7	6.5	4.5	10.4	11.6	10.3	9.2	7.2	7.4	6.7	5.7	5.2	5.3	5.3	5.3	5.6	5.8	6.0	9.7	11.7	13.2	14.7	16.2	18.2	21.0	24.2	29.0	33.4	36.6
Indonesia	7.8	7.9	8.9	9.2	10.1	10.1	11.5	12.6	14.4	15.9	4.7	5.4	5.3	4.3	6.3	9.7	10.9	9.5	11.4	14.4	13.7	13.8	19.3	23.8	26.3	33.3	27.2	29.4	28.3	33.2	28.2	28.3
Laos	—N/a				22.7	23.3	24.5	21.4	15.8	13.3	6.5	2.9	2.6	2.3	2.1	2.0	2.0	2.1	2.3	2.5	2.7	2.3	2.5	3.0	3.2	3.5	—N/a					
Malaysia	50.3	58.1	62.4	84.9	93.0	98.7	106.1	119.3	115.2	96.9	52.4	73.4	66.1	81.6	92.4	116.7	112.1	121.5	124.7	148.6	162.0	143.0	136.6	163.8	155.1	166.8	164.7	149.7	135.9	112.4	110.1	118.0
Myanmar	—N/a										128.8	150.5	193.3	200.4	230.6	502.4	614.7	673.2	—N/a													
Philippines	15.8	15.8	15.4	14.4	16.6	17.6	20.4	24.4	26.3	21.6	16.4	17.6	16.7	14.1	14.7	15.7	14.7	15.9	18.3	22.5	25.0	22.9	25.9	28.3	29.8	34.2	30.9	32.7	32.1	38.9	26.7	32.1
Singapore	419.7	480.2	598.0	652.3	728.9	750.6	818.9	1041.6	1127.0	1187.9	1156.8	1136.1	1074.9	1056.9	1103.2	1144.0	1207.4	1280.9	1324.4	1423.7	1560.9	1517.7	1580.3	1695.1	1708.2	1713.6	1736.7	1678.0	1746.4	1783.2	1881.9	1931.5
Thailand	33.0	34.8	39.1	45.4	51.2	54.1	61.3	64.7	65.5	53.7	34.3	33.0	29.9	27.1	28.3	29.3	28.7	30.3	37.1	53.2	67.1	71.8	73.9	81.7	81.0	86.6	83.7	83.3	85.2	91.3	99.0	105.1
Timor-Leste	DNE														—N/a			8.3	16.8	22.9	22.4	34.0	24.1	18.4	29.5	27.5	25.2	30.9	21.5	20.5	16.3	26.6
Viet Nam	20.1	6.9	7.5	6.2	4.7	4.1	5.9	—N/a								10.2	11.0	12.2	15.2	20.9	24.8	27.6	30.4	30.2	—N/a							
Australia	354.7	376.9	395.3	408.6	395.5	382.5	419.1	426.0	451.0	431.7	382.4	413.6	383.0	366.9	409.6	505.8	603.4	656.0	693.7	821.7	873.5	871.7	1048.0	1180.1	1144.6	1067.5	1092.7	1004.8	1087.4	1126.4	1078.0	1028.1
Fiji	34.1	40.1	41.9	44.2	41.0	42.4	44.0	44.7	41.9	39.1	28.2	29.5	39.5	40.3	37.9	45.7	57.2	52.5	65.3	90.4	63.4	60.1	58.6	70.4	68.5	67.1	86.3	49.1	62.4	85.8	94.1	93.8
New Zealand	288.6	285.5	311.3	287.0	248.5	243.2	270.3	312.0	333.1	314.7	256.2	254.1	222.4	203.9	218.5	281.7	315.0	336.1	349.7	404.9	388.3	375.4	441.8	470.8	468.8	472.3	497.9	421.2	449.3	495.1	532.3	611.9
Papua New Guinea	10.5	11.8	14.9	11.1	12.1	13.9	16.4	10.9	14.8	14.6	8.9	6.2	5.7	4.2	2.8	3.1	3.8	4.7	4.7	5.8	5.6	7.3	6.3	8.6	14.5	13.5	14.1	12.3	9.6	9.6	9.3	9.2
Albania	—N/a				9.7	12.3	15.8	16.4	14.8	9.6	10.8	13.7	14.5	17.0	18.8	24.4	32.5	35.7	46.0	64.2	85.1	61.5	63.1	67.3	62.9	62.0	61.5	45.8	45.3	50.1	61.0	68.6
Bosnia-Herzegovina	DNE				—N/a										64.1	53.8	53.2	46.0	47.4	51.8	62.1	64.9	59.3	57.9	54.7	55.8	54.7	47.3	46.6	46.6	51.8	55.5
Bulgaria	—N/a	232.8	89.9	26.5	29.5	33.0	28.6	37.1	25.8	29.8	39.4	44.3	43.9	51.2	58.0	72.9	80.2	86.9	93.8	130.7	154.4	121.1	112.1	102.7	98.5	111.3	103.2	87.9	93.8	101.4	136.3	303.9
Croatia	DNE				165.2	248.8	348.9	446.3	423.8	396.5	317.7	232.5	149.0	142.8	166.9	161.6	166.7	182.5	194.3	224.4	297.7	260.1	234.7	256.5	222.4	223.8	249.9	208.6	198.8	220.1	232.5	244.3
Czech Republic	DNE					78.7	90.6	102.9	108.6	95.6	113.0	117.0	112.5	115.1	145.8	184.2	199.4	237.8	237.9	261.4	280.0	259.2	237.1	234.2	209.9	203.0	191.0	167.9	184.1	195.3	254.1	272.3
Czechoslovakia	—N/a		149	—N/a		DNE																										
Estonia	DNE				—N/a	8.8	17.3	25.4	29.2	37.6	42.6	52.6	56.0	67.4	88.3	124.9	150.3	150.9	175.1	276.7	320.6	264.5	249.4	293.2	330.2	363.4	389.1	352.4	378.0	407.3	458.6	494.9
German DR	—N/a		DNE																													
Hungary	98.5	78.1	81.7	69.7	78.4	71.0	73.1	59.2	56.6	67.5	60.2	68.6	70.0	82.9	106.1	138.2	151.5	158.2	140.2	177.2	186.9	148.2	136.1	148.8	134.0	130.2	123.4	115.8	132.1	150.4	184.6	196.6
Kosovo	DNE																				0.5	15.5	21.7	28.5	24.0	26.7	29.4	30.0	27.3	29.8	32.7	33.7
Latvia	DNE				—N/a	6.9	13.3	17.4	15.4	15.5	17.4	23.5	29.4	36.9	63.1	82.0	100.6	121.0	165.3	219.1	267.9	169.6	122.6	141.8	123.6	138.7	146.3	141.5	204.9	247.3	375.2	372.3
Lithuania	DNE				—N/a	5.7	5.8	8.4	11.7	21.1	38.9	30.2	40.1	48.0	52.7	61.7	80.1	90.8	106.4	135.6	168.5	127.8	104.5	111.8	107.9	117.9	143.7	160.7	219.9	285.4	377.1	392.7
Montenegro	DNE																98.7	100.9	103.6	137.0	123.1	120.3	126.9	108.2	103.5	107.8	90.7	98.4	104.7	125.7	142.2	
North Macedonia	DNE				—N/a				65.7	41.6	39.3	32.7	34.3	110.8	51.9	56.4	65.8	61.6	61.1	78.7	83.5	76.7	62.8	63.9	57.6	60.9	59.8	48.1	49.8	48.4	57.4	72.6
Poland	47.3	39.5	40.6	45.2	49.3	55.4	58.7	70.7	80.1	82.8	90.5	83.7	81.6	94.2	98.1	108.0	124.4	153.7	172.6	223.9	243.7	206.1	229.3	247.0	235.1	243.1	271.6	268.5	241.2	260.1	317.5	314.2
Romania	107.9	109.6	74.0	58.7	35.6	31.1	40.5	42.8	38.3	47.5	55.8	42.8	42.3	44.8	48.3	57.6	70.9	92.3	106.0	124.0	144.0	107.8	101.9	117.0	104.0	121.8	134.3	129.5	133.6	184.3	223.5	255.4
Serbia	DNE				—N/a					93.4	66.3	77.0	35.5	52.5	72.6	78.6	80.0	68.5	77.1	106.8	122.7	108.0	97.0	110.1	95.5	103.1	102.6	81.6	80.2	90.8	92.9	130.4
Slovakia	DNE					49.9	55.9	117.1	119.1	92.7	73.7	60.6	63.4	73.0	81.5	115.7	131.7	152.5	168.8	211.0	261.5	250.0	210.5	196.9	188.4	178.5	183.8	181.4	184.3	192.6	237.7	341.8
Slovenia	DNE				140.3	115.1	119.3	168.1	165.9	146.3	151.5	138.3	111.9	136.6	164.5	209.7	247.8	257.7	304.0	344.2	410.0	392.8	377.9	324.5	264.1	245.6	235.2	193.5	216.6	228.2	254.8	273.6
Yugoslavia	—N/a				DNE																											
Armenia	DNE				—N/a	2.9	—N/a	16.2	16.5	20.4	21.5	22.1	22.2	21.7	21.1	25.4	32.7	47.2	63.6	95.5	136.2	124.5	137.3	135.9	131.9	153.4	157.2	152.9	146.9	150.6	206.3	227.6
Azerbaijan	DNE				1.5	10.2	5.7	8.5	9.1	11.6	13.4	14.9	14.7	16.1	16.9	21.1	27.0	35.7	83.1	108.5	182.3	165.0	163.5	336.8	350.4	358.8	360.5	301.4	143.5	155.3	168.1	184.5
Belarus	DNE				—N/a			17.8	18.2	24.9	22.8	16.7	14.2	18.1	21.0	23.9	32.7	47.3	66.4	78.8	93.4	71.6	81.5	80.3	86.8	103.1	107.2	76.7	63.2	66.8	75.7	82.5
Georgia	DNE				—N/a				14.0	9.3	9.0	5.8	4.3	5.5	8.0	10.1	16.7	50.8	96.5	223.6	263.2	146.5	110.8	114.9	121.1	109.1	103.0	74.4	78.5	77.9	81.8	79.1
Moldova	DNE				—N/a			3.1	3.6	4.1	2.5	1.4	1.2	1.4	1.7	2.0	2.3	2.9	4.0	5.5	9.0	6.1	4.5	5.6	5.9	6.6	6.8	5.7	6.7	7.6	9.2	11.0
Russia	867.4	766.7	763.1	—N/a		52.3	91.3	86.0	106.9	119.0	54.0	44.0	63.0	80.1	96.0	117.4	145.4	190.3	240.7	303.9	392.2	359.5	409.3	488.8	565.8	612.2	585.5	458.1	476.6	457.1	421.2	446.3
Ukraine	DNE				—N/a	2.4	13.4	15.3	20.0	28.9	18.3	12.6	14.3	15.3	18.2	23.2	28.0	35.8	44.8	61.7	72.8	50.5	56.5	54.9	62.4	63.9	66.4	65.9	65.8	73.0	94.2	118.9
Austria	223.8	211.2	255.4	256.5	273.3	268.0	280.3	320.1	306.6	269.5	268.6	263.9	238.6	220.9	231.3	291.3	326.1	325.5	318.7	421.0	449.2	398.3	382.7	403.4	374.9	377.4	383.6	307.1	329.9	355.8	381.0	361.6
Belgium	411.4	388.8	464.1	460.6	409.9	370.2	388.4	436.8	415.5	360.3	357.9	350.9	310.3	294.2	303.6	372.0	406.7	400.9	405.7	482.7	584.1	517.6	479.5	499.3	466.3	471.9	462.7	372.3	374.8	388.1	421.6	417.5
Cyprus	331.1	326.2	536.7	534.3	787.1	327.7	356.5	349.4	513.0	599.4	532.3	313.1	298.1	341.2	248.2	290.3	335.0	370.6	370.8	380.9	419.6	429.2	429.2	426.5	365.2	336.5	310.5	282.4	252.4	304.4	374.3	335.1
Denmark	453.0	425.6	515.4	518.3	548.7	516.7	521.7	595.9	587.3	531.4	537.0	523.3	447.9	471.3	501.4	593.9	662.4	639.7	715.7	763.4	870.9	784.8	810.7	809.4	788.2	747.9	716.2	591.4	629.1	656.6	792.5	789.5
Finland	343.5	354.9	428.6	438.5	411.5	318.5	344.6	372.9	393.6	377.9	379.5	319.5	300.3	284.4	309.1	473.5	551.9	570.3	592.8	622.3	744.1	737.6	692.8	760.6	728.2	765.1	729.8	620.2	621.2	622.5	680.3	717.8
France	540.3	525.9	631.3	630.2	663.2	623.6	647.5	694.2	671.9	596.0	575.5	556.6	481.3	470.7	511.3	640.1	733.5	727.1	744.5	819.2	890.0	902.4	827.7	856.0	790.0	813.9	827.7	708.2	732.5	758.7	791.0	769.5
Germany	428.7	408.6	512.0	475.5	502.0	442.6	429.9	485.2	458.6	390.3	389.5	383.2	330.8	322.0	344.1	410.8	445.3	446.0	447.2	505.9	573.1	570.1	554.9	578.4	549.2	552.7	542.9	452.6	483.3	512.5	559.5	590.0
Greece	272.2	252.1	312.3	305.1	347.7	319.4	337.0	389.0	425.9	419.3	439.8	454.5	411.9	397.7	423.4	448.8	557.9	626.2	680.1	767.3	957.8	971.0	749.8	658.3	548.6	526.5	516.9	452.0	467.6	481.4	547.1	522.4
Iceland	0.0	0.0	0.0	0.0	0.0	0.0	0.0	0.0	0.0	0.0	0.0	0.0	0.0	0.0	0.0	0.0	0.0	0.0	0.0	0.0	0.0	0.0	0.0	0.0	0.0	0.0	0.0	0.0	0.0	0.0	0.0	0.0
Ireland	129.1	123.7	169.2	177.7	191.0	168.5	177.6	195.4	207.5	209.6	201.3	198.7	183.6	199.8	207.6	242.5	271.5	276.5	281.4	317.3	358.5	315.0	279.8	283.2	251.2	259.1	257.8	214.3	213.3	215.7	229.8	227.9
Italy	305.2	309.9	363.5	378.1	388.1	318.9	315.7	300.6	364.4	354.2	367.0	371.0	350.6	343.2	377.9	466.0	522.2	510.2	506.2	544.4	625.2	576.2	539.8	567.7	497.3	497.9	458.6	366.2	412.7	435.9	458.7	442.5
Luxembourg	229.9	201.1	253.3	278.9	314.8	272.4	313.1	348.5	341.8	319.2	336.1	326.4	293.9	364.1	345.7	444.1	519.4	532.4	530.8	602.3	487.7	449.0	539.8	494.8	447.4	476.7	503.2	487.3	450.1	604.3	650.8	696.4
Malta	62.9	59.4	58.4	59.6	72.6	66.4	74.6	82.6	87.6	81.2	75.1	71.6	64.4	68.4	71.2	85.1	100.6	129.7	109.4	120.8	136.8	143.6	141.8	133.8	118.4	126.2	131.4	119.5	136.8	146.7	152.2	189.9
Netherlands	455.4	430.4	495.9	481.0	521.2	462.1	464.4	517.9	503.0	436.9	434.2	443.7	375.0	387.1	417.6	515.8	575.7	584.5	621.5	695.5	746.9	729.7	672.6	695.9	617.2	607.1	611.7	511.7	536.8	562.9	651.5	705.4
Norway	688.2	693.9	799.3	770.0	886.1	735.6	783.9	803.3	805.1	735.9	747.6	739.6	649.5	655.7	894.4	988.5	1062.9	1054.5	1072.5	1244.9	1335.3	1283.6	1330.1	1461.6	1424.9	1455.2	1426.8	1118.4	1142.2	1220.8	1323.9	1302.0
Portugal	136.2	147.3	189.5	213.3	254.5	219.3	216.4	264.6	256.6	234.8	228.7	234.7	214.1	224.8	250.6	298.2	355.2	384.4	385.7	413.0	454.2	466.8	445.3	464.0	393.0	451.1	394.6	343.9	400.3	357.3	431.0	441.3
Spain	228.0	237.8	298.3	297.2	310.8	254.0	254.5	287.5	283.0	246.4	257.0	274.7	251.7	247.4	245.0	302.4	352.4	363.4	385.7	441.7	482.5	433.2	420.0	418.3	400.8	367.4	367.2	325.4	300.5	343.9	381.7	367.5
Sweden	581.0	591.1	720.1	721.1	738.9	572.9	585.9	648.4	700.2	586.7	578.6	580.3	539.3	463.9	488.1	592.7	613.4	610.5	613.1	697.0	652.3	543.6	626.8	668.1	654.3	678.8	676.4	551.7	551.8	558.0	574.9	589.9
Switzerland	500.1	467.2	609.7	597.8	609.2	525.7	562.0	664.0	602.4	494.9	492.7	442.3	392.0	385.0	399.2	449.9	478.4	471.7	446.4	467.7	537.7	525.7	527.0	629.0	573.4	620.7	562.1	544.9	545.5	547.4	546.0	602.8
United Kingdom	603.8	588.0	681.6	734.4	709.8	591.7	597.2	591.2	593.5	611.8	630.1	620.8	598.3	597.6	668.5	788.1	901.4	914.8	945.1	1073.7	1055.9	921.8	915.3	941.4	906.6	875.0	904.6	817.8	725.8	695.9	743.1	720.4
Bahrain	445.9	453.3	482.7	516.5	533.9	520.8	517.8	537.9	556.1	540.9	537.4	572.4	540.2	533.8	604.2	662.6	641.0	577.3	599.1	620.3	645.9	698.9	679.2	808.6	909.4	1024.8	1104.2	1051.1	1055.9	1025.9	973.4	856.0
Egypt	83.4	64.2	40.3	23.4	24.1	25.5	28.1	31.3	33.3	34.9	35.8	36.3	38.2	40.4	40.6	32.7	31.9	35.2	38.4	42.3	47.5	49.5	53.3	52.8	52.7	49.3	56.2	59.2	47.8	28.7	31.7	37.3
Iran	355.9	297.4	292.3	304.3	335.7	24.2	28.1	40.7	57.0	73.5	85.7	102.6	126.9	156.2	48.2	54.6	76.0	97.4	124.0	130.8	153.7	172.6	183.9	191.3	218.3	156.9	127.8	134.9	154.1	172.7	137.3	152.2
Iraq	—N/a																23.3	41.6	45.0	71.3	109.8	111.7	126.2	139.3	129.9	234.6	201.2	270.0	163.1	197.5	164.4	193.3
Israel	1650.1	1280.9	1467.7	2034.7	1538.7	1572.8	1522.3	1507.4	1566.9	1541.5	1420.5	1313.8	1400.5	1403.2	1293.7	1310.1	1345.3	1366.4	1394.4	1662.3	1966.1	1773.9	1888.7	2025.2	1917.4	2110.6	2267.6	2070.2	2156.6	2357.4	2357.5	2402.2
Jordan	180.5	112.6	90.4	115.2	92.5	93.1	92.5	65.3	88.2	91.6	100.4	101.8	103.3	101.4	98.1	112.6	105.1	104.7	117.1	165.1	207.2	227.5	214.5	208.1	182.1	169.6	173.7	174.3	185.2	198.2	196.5	201.2
Kuwait	837.5	992.2	4276.9	6362.6	3302.6	1681.2	1986.4	2299.3	1992.4	1435.0	1246.3	1171.5	1318.8	1276.9	1320.3	1448.3	1567.9	1545.9	1515.7	1643.6	1668.0	1492.0	1449.0	1702.5	1774.2	1615.8	1580.1	1495.2	1629.3	1667.8	1763.5	1832.6
Lebanon	14.6	—N/a	76.5	78.5	143.9	139.5	187.3	211.5	203.7	185.4	187.9	221.4	242.0	240.2	217.0	210.4	208.9	204.8	212.0	241.7	245.4	296.3	320.1	312.7	317.3	327.4	362.6	342.8	388.2	358.0	404.6	367.8
Oman	684.6	672.8	799.0	662.6	765.0	694.9	707.5	686.8	642.6	658.8	585.4	594.5	695.4	793.0	800.2	825.3	912.2	1090.7	1171.2	1221.1	1258.6	1170.8	1207.1	1538.2	2644.5	2328.5	2039.5	1765.4	1771.7	1457.9	1566.5	1352.7
Qatar	2214.9	1837.7	1660.4	1837.7	—N/a									1187.4	1150.8	1025.3	1025.5	1042.1	1282.2	1613.1	1177.3	1011.0	—N/a									
Saudi Arabia	886.2	813.8	1007.5	975.1	888.8	926.1	784.0	708.2	700.9	934.0	1054.5	907.2	966.1	991.7	848.5	834.8	903.9	1066.2	1207.5	1408.4	1476.4	1549.6	1650.0	1716.8	1937.9	2230.1	2612.3	2748.8	1962.6	2126.8	2207.5	1805.3
Syria	317.7	122.8	131.9	225.8	225.7	105.1	117.3	66.8	67.4	69.0	70.3	70.4	54.7	61.0	64.6	82.5	77.9	79.0	75.3	80.4	83.8	102.9	109.8	118.3	—N/a							
Turkey	51.2	63.7	98.6	103.4	110.5	124.9	92.0	113.0	126.4	129.1	143.2	159.8	158.0	112.4	138.9	155.5	163.0	177.9	189.6	215.4	238.7	225.0	244.0	231.6	237.0	242.7	227.6	199.5	223.3	219.7	238.6	245.1
UAE	—N/a									1248.7	1425.5	1427.2	1874.8	1755.5	1539.1	1571.9	1675.5	1439.4	1351.9	1371.6	1632.2	1747.6	2047.3	2144.0	2081.0	2561.6	2469.6	—N/a				2020.4
Yemen	DNE		68.9	83.6	100.9	112.6	164.6	54.0	26.9	24.9	23.4	23.4	27.2	30.1	40.0	42.5	37.6	40.6	39.7	49.4	54.7	63.1	62.5	67.7	66.1	65.6	66.4	—N/a				
Yemen, North	—N/a		DNE																													

== See also ==
- Military budget
- List of countries with highest military expenditures
- List of countries by past military expenditure
- List of countries in Europe by military expenditures
