= List of countries with highest military expenditures =

The following is a list of countries with the most military expenditure.

== By total spending ==
The first list is based on the Stockholm International Peace Research Institute (SIPRI) fact sheet, which includes a list of the world's top 40 military spenders as of 2025, based on current market exchange rates.

The second list is based on the 2026 edition of The Military Balance, published by the International Institute for Strategic Studies (IISS) using average market exchange rates.

40 militaries with the largest spending worldwide in 2025
SIPRI Military Expenditure Database

Rank	Country	Spending (US$ bn)	% of GDP	% of global spending
1	United States (Note: According to the Congressional Budget Office, the actual defense spending by the United States Federal Government in 2025 was $893 billion.)	954.0	3.1	33.0
2	China	336.0	1.7	12.0
3	Russia	190.0	7.5	6.6
4	Germany	114.0	2.3	3.9
5	India	92.1	2.3	3.2
6	United Kingdom	89.0	2.4	3.1
7	Ukraine	84.1	40.0	2.9
8	Saudi Arabia	83.2	6.5	2.9
9	France (Note: The figures for France, Poland and Turkey exclude expenditure for National Gendarmerie, Żandarmeria Wojskowa and Gendarmerie General Command.)	68.0	2.0	2.4
10	Japan	62.2	1.4	2.2
11	Israel	48.3	7.8	1.7
12	Italy	48.1	1.9	1.7
13	South Korea	47.8	2.6	1.7
14	Poland	46.8	4.5	1.6
15	Spain	40.2	2.1	1.4
16	Canada	37.5	1.6	1.3
17	Australia	35.3	1.9	1.2
18	Turkey	30.0	1.9	1.0
19	Netherlands	28.9	2.2	1.0
20	Algeria	25.4	8.8	0.9
21	Brazil	23.9	1.1	0.8
22	Taiwan	18.2	2.1	0.6
23	Singapore	17.4	3.0	0.6
24	Norway	17.0	3.3	0.6
25	Sweden	16.5	2.5	0.6
26	Indonesia	15.0	1.0	0.5
27	Denmark	14.9	3.3	0.5
28	Belgium	14.5	2.0	0.5
29	Colombia	14.5	3.2	0.5
30	Mexico	13.6	0.7	0.5
31	Pakistan	11.9	2.9	0.4
32	Vietnam	10.5	2.2	0.4
33	Romania	9.7	2.3	0.3
34	Greece	8.4	3.0	0.3
35	Kuwait	8.1	4.7	0.3
36	Finland	8.1	2.6	0.3
37	Switzerland	7.6	0.8	0.3
38	Iran	7.4	2.1	0.3
39	Czech Republic	7.1	1.8	0.2
40	Iraq	6.4	2.4	0.2

List by the International Institute for Strategic Studies

2026 edition of "The Military Balance" from the
International Institute for Strategic Studies (IISS)
for the year 2025

Rank	Country	Spending (US$ bn)
1	United States	921.0
2	China	251.3
3	Russia	186.2
4	Germany	107.3
5	United Kingdom	94.3
6	India	78.3
7	Saudi Arabia	72.5
8	France	70.0
9	Japan	58.9
10	Ukraine	44.4
11	South Korea	43.8
12	Italy	40.1
13	Israel	39.7
14	Australia	37.3
15	Poland	33.2

== By share of GDP ==
The following lists are of countries by military spending as a share of GDP—more specifically, a list of the 15 countries with the greatest share in recent years:

The first list uses the Stockholm International Peace Research Institute as a source, while the second list gets its data from the International Institute for Strategic Studies.

List by the Stockholm International Peace Research Institute
SIPRI Military Expenditure Database (2025)
List by the International Institute for Strategic Studies
Top 15 Defence Budgets 2020

Rank	Country	% of GDP	Military spending 2025 (US$ bn)
1	Ukraine	39.56%	84.1
2	Algeria	8.83%	25.4
3	Israel	7.81%	48.3
4	Russia	7.50%	190.4
5	Saudi Arabia	6.48%	83.2
6	Azerbaijan	6.47%	4.9
7	Armenia	6.09%	1.7
8	Oman	5.68%	6.0
9	Kuwait	4.69%	8.1
10	Jordan	4.56%	2.6
11	Poland	4.50%	46.8
12	Mali	3.87%	1.0
13	Latvia	3.61%	1.7
14	Morocco	3.54%	6.3
15	South Sudan	3.42%	0.2
16	Estonia	3.37%	1.6
17	Burkina Faso	3.30%	0.9
18	Norway	3.28%	17.0
19	Denmark	3.25%	14.9
20	Burundi	3.24%	0.2
21	Colombia	3.20%	14.5
22	Chad	3.19%	0.6
23	United States	3.12%	954.4
24	Botswana	3.11%	0.6
25	Bahrain	3.11%	1.5
26	Lithuania	3.08%	3.0
27	Singapore	3.05%	17.4
28	Greece	2.99%	8.4
29	Kyrgyzstan	2.92%	0.6
30	Pakistan	2.91%	11.9

Rank	Country	% of GDP
1	Oman	12.0%
2	Afghanistan	10.6%
3	Lebanon	10.5%
4	Kuwait	7.1%
5	Saudi Arabia	7.1%
6	Algeria	6.7%
7	Iraq	5.8%
8	UAE	5.6%
9	Azerbaijan	5.4%
10	Morocco	5.3%
11	Israel	5.2%
12	Jordan	4.9%
13	Armenia	4.8%
14	Mali	4.5%
15	Qatar	4.4%

* Italic values are SIPRI estimates.

== Graphics ==
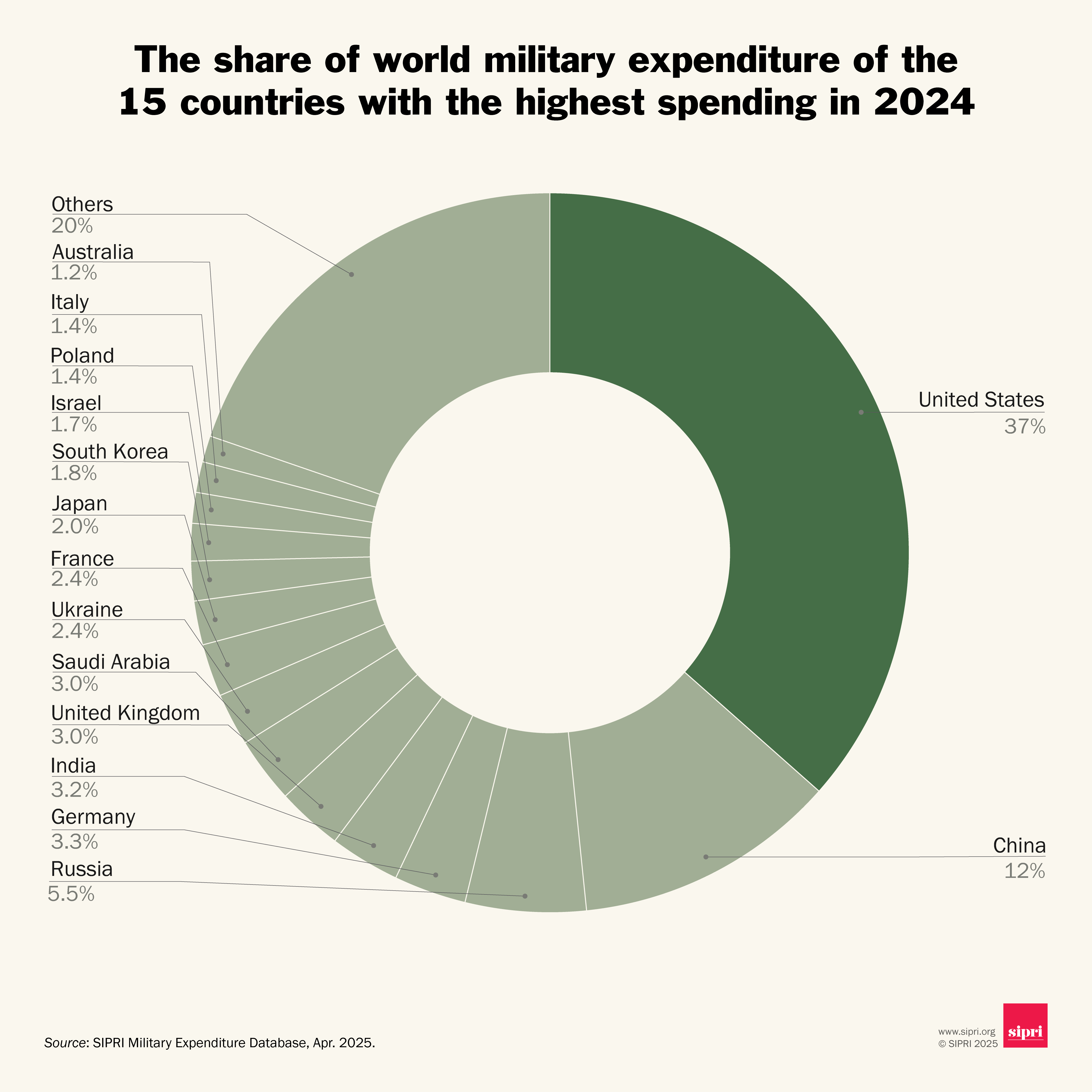

== See also ==
- Arms industry
- Military budget
- List of countries by past military expenditure
- List of countries with highest military expenditure per capita
- List of countries by Global Militarization Index
- List of countries in Europe by military expenditures
- List of countries by number of military and paramilitary personnel
