= Service Integration Maturity Model =

The Service Integration Maturity Model (SIMM) is a standardized model for organizations to guide their transformation to a service based business model. By having a standard maturity model, it becomes possible for the organizations or industry to benchmark their SIMM levels, to have a roadmap for transformation to assist their planning and for vendors to offer services and software against these benchmarks.

SIMM may also serve as a framework for the transformation process that can be customized to suit the specific needs of organizations and assessments. This process is a simple sequence of steps: configure the assessment framework, determine the initial level of maturity, and determine the target level of maturity and a transformation path from initial to target level.

The Service Integration Maturity Model (SIMM) helps an organization create a roadmap for the incremental transformation of that organisation towards more mature levels of service integration in order to achieve increasing business benefits associated with higher levels of maturity. SIMM is used to determine which organisational characteristics are desirable in order to attain a new level of maturity. This will determine whether problems occurring at the current level can be solved by evolving to a higher level of service integration maturity.

The Open Group has adopted SIMM as the foundation for the Open Group Service Integration Maturity Model (OSIMM), the industry's first collaborative maturity model for SOA adoption.
