= List of countries in Europe by military expenditures =

This article lists military spending in European countries by varying methods including as a percentage of GDP per capita and as a total capital expenditure as listed by the Stockholm International Peace Research Institute unless otherwise stated or cited.

The share of total expenditure, the average defence spending was 2.7 % in 2023 in the EU and 2.5% in the euro area. As a share of GDP the average was 1.3% in the EU and 1.2% in the euro area.

Total defence expenditure of the European Defence Agency (EDA) Member States was €279 billion in 2023, which was 1.6% of the 27 EDA Member States’ GDP.

== As a percentage of GDP ==
The (European Union) European Defence Agency member state average spend on defence as a percentage of GDP was 1.9% in 2024.

Key
NATO member

Country	Percentage of GDP expenditure, 2025
Albania	2.03
Andorra	(Note: Defence is the responsibility of France and Spain.)
Armenia	6.09
Austria	1.10
Azerbaijan	6.47
Belarus	2.40
Belgium	2.01
Bosnia and Herzegovina	0.73
Bulgaria	2.01
Croatia	2.02
Cyprus	1.61
Czech Republic	1.84
Denmark	3.25
Estonia	3.37
Finland	2.57
France	2.03
(Georgia (country)) Georgia	1.75
Germany	2.27
Greece	2.99
Hungary	2.04
Iceland	(Note: Defence is the responsibility of NATO.)
(Republic of Ireland) Ireland	0.22
Italy	1.89
Kazakhstan	0.43
Kosovo	1.85
Latvia	3.61
Liechtenstein	0.4 (Note: No regular military forces.)
Lithuania	3.08
Luxembourg	0.85
Malta	0.45
Moldova	0.56
Monaco	(Note: Defence is the responsibility of France.)
Montenegro	1.89
Netherlands	2.19
North Macedonia	1.97
Norway	3.28
Poland	4.50
Portugal	1.71
Romania	2.28
Russia	7.50
San Marino	(Note: Defence is the responsibility of Italy.)
Serbia	2.76
Slovakia	2.03
Slovenia	1.54
Spain	2.13
Sweden	2.47
Switzerland	0.76
Ukraine	39.56
United Kingdom	2.35
Vatican City	

== By total capital expenditure ==
Key
NATO member

Country	US $m in 2025
Albania	623.6
Andorra	
Armenia	1,725.2
Austria	6,353.4
Azerbaijan	4,939.0
Belarus	1,938.6
Belgium	14,532.0
Bosnia and Herzegovina	231.4
Bulgaria	2,589.2
Croatia	2,101.6
Cyprus	663.3
Czech Republic	7,051.5
Denmark	14,948.8
Estonia	1,575.9
Finland	8,081.6
France	68,007.6
(Georgia (country)) Georgia	657.9
Germany	113,585.9
Greece	8,388.4
Hungary	5,002.0
Iceland	
(Republic of Ireland) Ireland	1,551.1
Italy	48,281.3
Kazakhstan	1,308.6
Kosovo	234.5
Latvia	1,731.6
Liechtenstein	
Lithuania	2,952.2
Luxembourg	855.4
Malta	124.7
Moldova	113.3
Monaco	
Montenegro	176.5
Netherlands	28,944.3
North Macedonia	374.8
Norway	17,033.6
Poland	46,760.1
Portugal	5,861.3
Romania	9,725.4
Russia	190,416.6
San Marino	
Serbia	2,781.3
Slovakia	3,118.3
Slovenia	1,221.7
Spain	40,211.8
Sweden	16,473.5
Switzerland	7,591.4
Ukraine	84,109.0
United Kingdom	88,977.5
Vatican City	

== See also ==
- List of sovereign states and dependent territories in Europe by GDP (PPP)
- List of European countries by fiscal balance
- List of metropolitan areas in the European Union by GDP
- List of European countries by budget revenues
- List of European countries by budget revenues per capita
- Economy of Europe
- World economy
- European Union
- OSCE countries statistics
