= List of exports of Romania =

Exports of Romania by product category (2019) Chemical products Transportation Machines Mineral products Plastics and rubbers Metals Foodstuffs Precious metals Textiles Instruments Animal products Vegetable products Paper goods Footwear and headwear Miscellaneous Stone and glass Wood products Animal and vegetable bi-products Animal hides Arts and antiques Weapons

Romania has a complex, high-income market economy, the 45th largest in the world by total nominal GDP and the 36th largest based on purchasing power parity. The country is a regional leader in multiple fields, such as IT and motor vehicle production.

In 2016, Romania was the 46th largest exporter of goods in the world.

In 2015, Romania's largest trading partner was Germany, followed by Italy. Romania's main exports to Germany were insulated wire, cars and vehicle parts, whereas its main German imports are cars and vehicle parts. The principal Italian imports to Romania include hides, footwear parts, pharmaceuticals, telephones, and vehicle parts. Romania's chief exports to Italy included leather footwear, cars, telephones, tobacco, men's suits, seats and iron pipes.

2.8% of the country's GDP is derived from agricultural activity. While Romania imports substantial quantities of grain, it is largely self-sufficient in other agricultural products and food stuffs. Food must be regulated for sale in the retail market, therefore Romania imports almost no food products from other countries. In 2006 Romania imported food products worth €2.4 billion, up almost 20% versus 2005, when imports were worth slightly more than €2 billion. The European Union is Romania's main trade partner in agri-food products. Romanian EU exports represent 64%, and imports from EU countries represent 54%. Other important partners are the Central European Free Trade Agreement countries, Turkey, Moldova and the United States.

== Main export goods ==
The following is a list of the exports of Romania. Data is for 2017, in billions of United States dollars, as reported by The Observatory of Economic Complexity. Currently the top thirty exports are listed.

Rank	Product	Value ($ billion)
1	Vehicle parts	7.09
2	Insulated wire	4.55
3	Cars	4.04
4	Refined petroleum	1.96
5	Rubber tires	1.79
6	Seats	1.72
7	Electrical control boards	1.69
8	Wheat	1.47
9	Ball bearings	0.942
10	Low-voltage protective equipment	0.941
11	Electric heaters	0.916
12	Leather footwear	0.899
13	Packaged pharmaceuticals	0.788
14	Non-knit women's suits	0.770
15	Corn	0.731
16	Rolled tobacco	0.729
17	Liquid pumps	0.718
18	Electrical lighting and signalling equipment	0.693
19	Passenger and cargo ships	0.673
20	Air pumps	0.666
21	Non-knit men's suits	0.655
22	Spark-ignition engines	0.643
23	Sunflower seeds	0.622
24	Other furniture	0.589
25	Rapeseed	0.581
26	Iron pipes	0.570
27	Telephones	0.549
28	Thermostats	0.546
29	Sawn wood	0.534
30	Engine parts	0.520
