= Duće =

Village in Croatia

- Location within Croatia
- Coordinates: 43°27′N 16°40′E
- Country: Croatia
- County: Split-Dalmatia
- Municipality: Dugi Rat

Area
  - Total: 3.4 km^{2} (1.3 sq mi)

Population (2021)
  - Total: 1,560
  - Density: 460/km^{2} (1,200/sq mi)
- Time zone: UTC+1 (CET)
  - Summer (DST): UTC+2 (CEST)

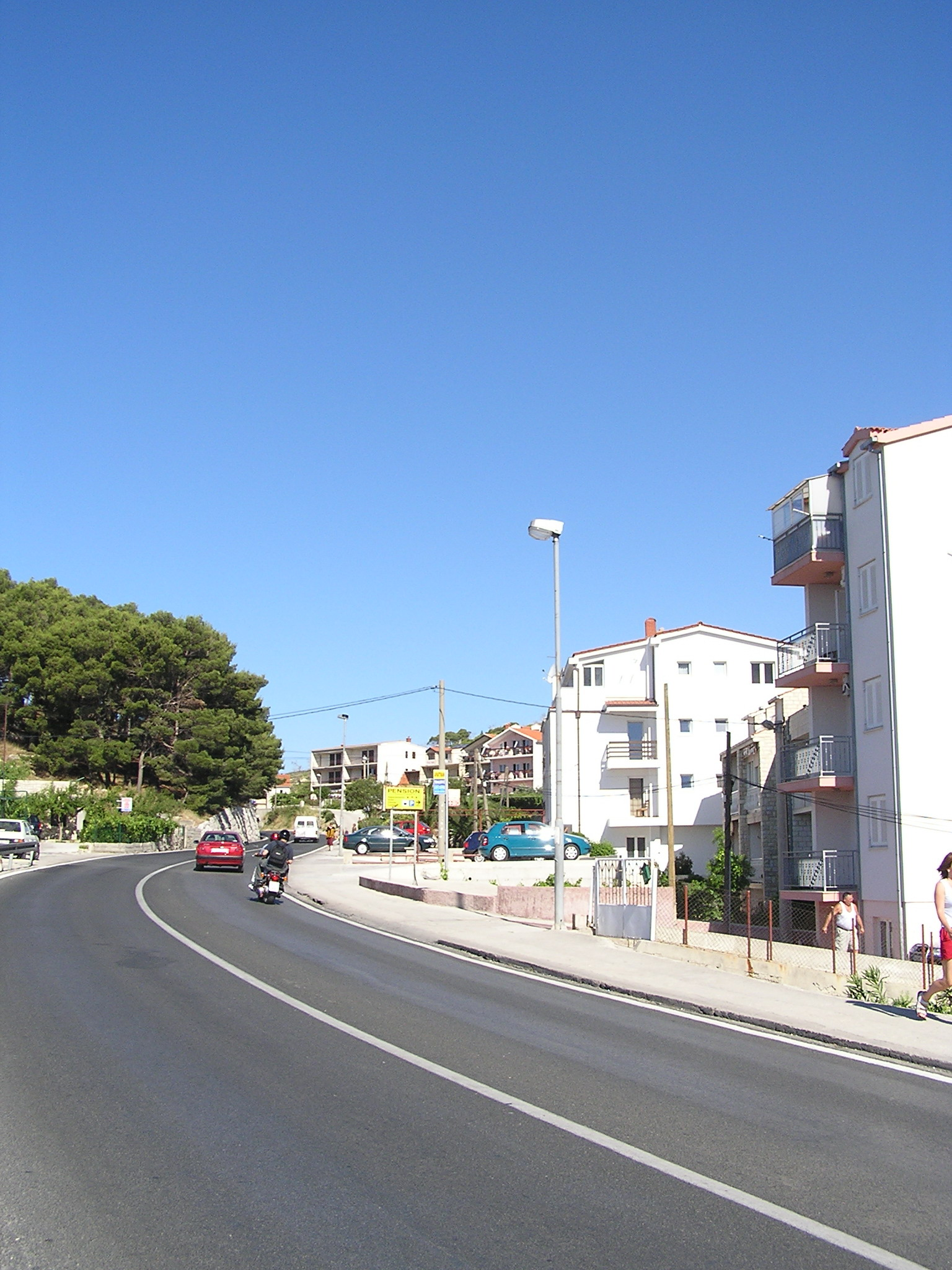
State road 8 in Duće, Croatia

Duće is a Croatian village situated close to Omiš in the Dugi Rat municipality, Split-Dalmatia County. It is a series of small settlements in Poljica, the area between the foot of the Mosor mountains and the Adriatic Sea.

The village was founded prior to the 12th century. The church of St. Marko is mentioned in 12th-century documents while the church of St. Marija is older still. Duće previously formed a part of the Republic of Poljica ruled by the Grand Duke according to the decrees of the Poljica Statute. Duće is a settlement that consists of two parts: the modern touristic one, located by the Adriatic Sea and the ancient, rural one, located in the foot of the Mosor mountains. The place comprises Luke, Rogača, Vavlja, Golubinka, Glavice and Dočina. It has around 2000 inhabitants. The most important economic activity is tourism.
