= Mila Gojsalić =

Croatian folk heroine

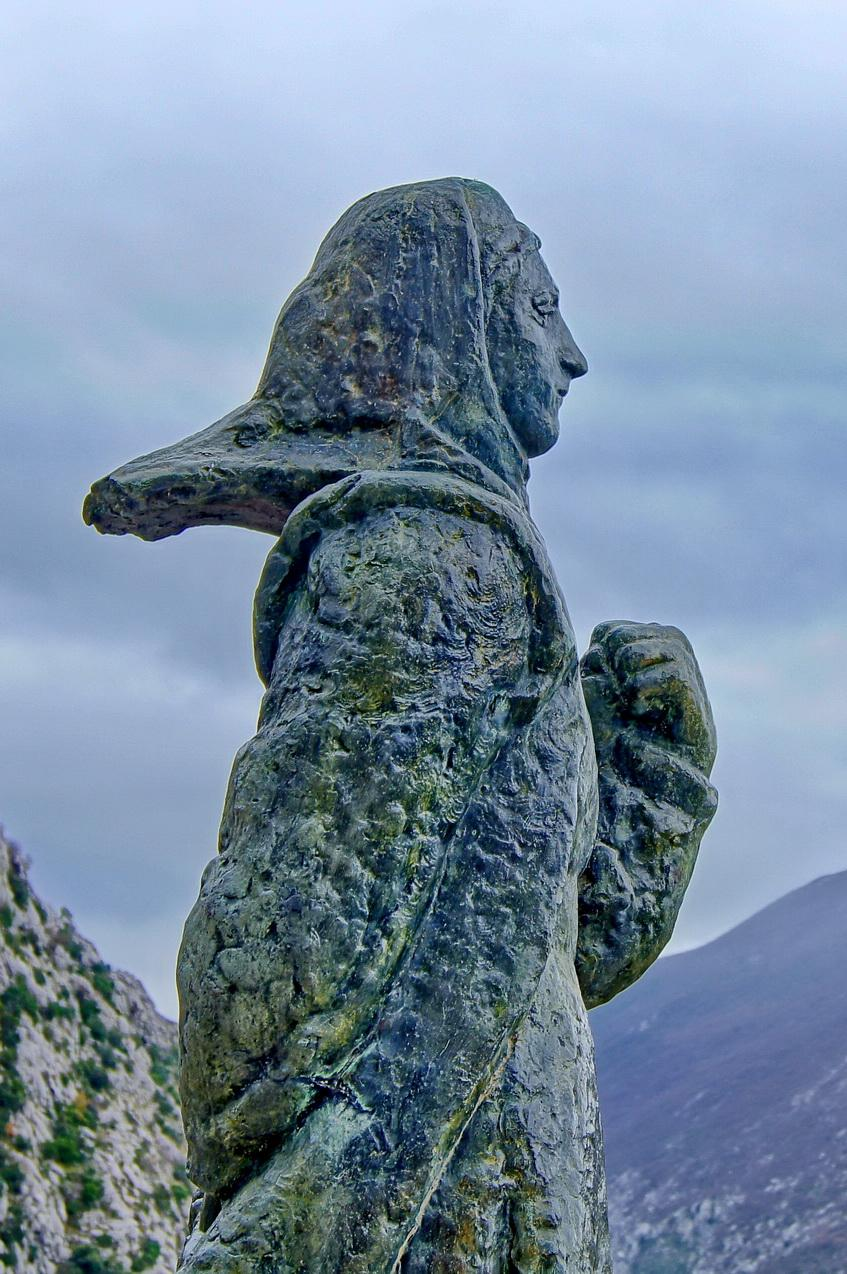
- Mila Gojsalić by Ivan Meštrović
- Born: Kostanje
- Died: 1530; Podgrac
- Cause of death: Suicide bombing
- Monuments: Mila Gojsalić by Ivan Meštrović
- Other names: Mile Gojsalića
- Era: Hundred Years' Croatian–Ottoman War
- Known for: Suicide attack of an Ottoman camp
- Relatives: Gojslav of Croatia (distant descendant)

Mila Gojsalić (died 1530) is a Croatian legendary folk heroine from small region of Poljica, situated between Split and Omiš in present-day Croatia.

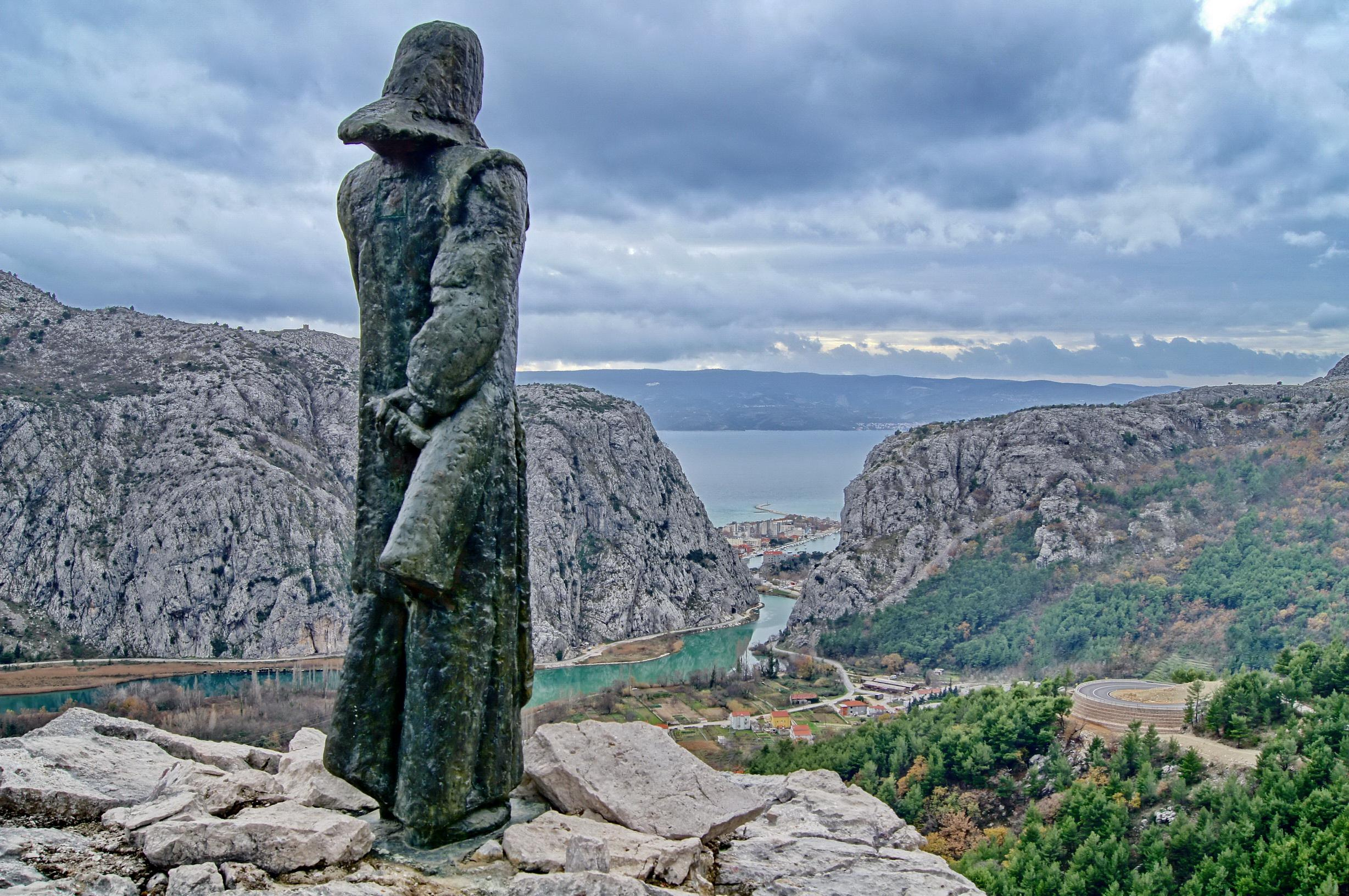
Mila Gojsalić by Ivan Meštrović, bronze, at Gata near Omiš, Croatia, above the mouth of Cetina River

According to tradition, her origins are from the village of Kostanje in the Dalmatian hinterland, and allegedly she was a distant descendant of Croatian king Gojslav. The legend started evolving around time of the Ottoman wars in Croatia, and it is possibly modeled on that of Marko Marulić's heroine Judita herself. The basic narrative revolves around the legendary battle, placed in 1530, and the tale of Ottoman commander, Ahmed Pasha, who allegedly gathered an army of 10,000 men with a goal to conquer Poljica, while setting up a camp in a place called Podgrac. Mila Gojsalić went on to lose her virginity to Ahmed Pasha in order to be able to infiltrate the Ottoman camp and blow up the munitions stockpile, killing Ahmed Pasha, numerous officers and soldiers, and herself.

Ivan Meštrović sculptured the statue of her, installed above the town of Omiš, while Jakov Gotovac composed the opera to her honour. August Šenoa also wrote about her. In her birthplace, every summer there is a cultural manifestation called the Days of Mila Gojsalić. Her house is still in the village and is completely renewed.

== See also ==
- Book of Judith
- Diva Grabovčeva
- Judita
