= List of sovereign states in Europe by GDP (nominal) =

Map of the (transcontinental) European countries by nominal GDP in 2025: > 2 trillion > 1 trillion > 500 billion > 100 billion < 100 billion

Gross domestic product (GDP) is the market value of all final goods and services from a nation in a given year. Countries are sorted by nominal GDP estimates from financial and statistical institutions, which are calculated at market or government official exchange rates. Nominal GDP does not take into account differences in the cost of living in different countries, and the results can vary greatly from one year to another based on fluctuations in the exchange rates of the country's currency. Such fluctuations may change a country's ranking from one year to the next, even though they often make little or no difference in the standard of living of its population.

== List ==
This is a sortable list of all European countries by their gross domestic product in millions of US dollars at market or official government exchange rates (nominal GDP), according to the International Monetary Fund. The economic and political map of Europe also includes: Turkey, Georgia, Armenia, Azerbaijan, Cyprus and Kosovo.

Country	2030	2025	2024	2023	2022	2021	2020	2019	2018	2017	2016	2015	2014	2013	2012	2011	2010
Germany	6,013,749	5,013,574	4,684,182	4,563,523	4,204,327	4,358,188	3,938,244	3,957,645	4,053,846	3,761,764	3,536,808	3,423,915	3,966,823	3,808,142	3,600,175	3,824,155	3,470,987
United Kingdom	5,199,779	3,958,780	3,644,636	3,371,118	3,125,404	3,144,079	2,698,705	2,853,074	2,875,024	2,682,384	2,699,086	2,928,558	3,066,304	2,786,665	2,707,571	2,664,719	2,487,924
France	4,009,171	3,361,557	3,160,902	3,061,093	2,796,987	2,968,405	2,645,806	2,723,094	2,782,838	2,587,955	2,469,726	2,442,731	2,861,973	2,816,119	2,684,706	2,869,903	2,648,391
Italy	2,779,440	2,422,855	2,372,059	2,305,271	2,105,722	2,180,656	1,905,956	2,019,831	2,100,387	1,970,027	1,886,590	1,845,615	2,173,815	2,153,259	2,099,259	2,306,568	2,146,687
Russia	2,384,213	2,076,396	2,161,205	2,059,762	2,295,527	1,828,927	1,488,118	1,695,724	1,653,005	1,575,140	1,280,648	1,356,703	2,048,837	2,288,428	2,191,486	2,046,621	1,633,111
Spain	2,201,213	1,799,511	1,722,227	1,620,558	1,447,636	1,462,216	1,288,751	1,403,651	1,432,292	1,321,288	1,242,673	1,206,287	1,380,600	1,362,207	1,331,838	1,487,307	1,429,155
Turkey	2,325,620	1,567,406	1,322,405	1,130,062	905,800	807,893	717,114	760,388	797,707	859,020	869,204	867,054	939,924	958,088	877,681	837,924	777,443
Netherlands	1,514,003	1,272,011	1,227,174	1,154,694	1,047,364	1,055,173	931,814	929,006	930,155	847,934	796,944	775,822	901,789	883,964	846,225	912,980	853,161
Poland	1,304,959	979,960	908,583	809,706	695,734	689,253	605,930	602,592	594,641	528,497	472,883	479,729	542,266	518,180	498,149	527,848	478,111
Switzerland	1,162,661	947,125	936,738	894,867	828,522	814,699	741,288	721,867	725,910	695,544	687,771	693,805	726,634	706,748	686,553	715,864	598,339
Belgium	791,414	684,864	664,965	644,968	593,906	598,892	529,269	536,787	542,885	500,733	474,141	461,091	538,127	524,106	498,731	527,106	481,949
Sweden	761,499	620,297	610,118	585,490	579,896	637,187	545,148	532,169	551,312	536,084	514,218	501,698	577,730	584,128	549,742	570,541	492,753
Ireland	734,181	598,840	577,216	551,554	549,003	531,660	436,205	407,170	395,641	348,411	305,649	302,422	266,857	243,305	227,415	241,295	222,167
Austria	628,259	534,301	521,269	512,509	472,339	480,786	434,050	443,033	452,787	414,780	393,579	379,584	438,669	426,587	407,008	428,879	390,146
Norway	591,969	504,276	483,727	482,950	596,298	503,368	367,633	408,743	439,789	401,745	370,957	388,160	501,737	526,014	512,777	501,361	431,052
Denmark	554,224	449,940	429,458	407,092	401,946	408,378	355,631	345,402	355,293	331,611	312,182	301,759	352,833	344,631	326,793	344,316	322,346
Romania	524,867	403,395	384,148	350,847	296,928	286,783	252,372	251,652	243,651	210,530	185,337	177,878	199,989	189,839	179,228	192,846	170,329
Czech Republic	438,859	360,244	344,931	343,207	301,831	290,973	251,110	256,794	251,992	221,564	198,161	189,108	210,911	213,024	210,363	231,429	211,169
Kazakhstan	425,854	300,538	284,810	261,840	225,496	197,112	171,082	181,667	179,340	166,806	137,278	184,388	221,416	236,635	207,999	192,626	148,047
Portugal	388,164	321,440	308,590	289,781	257,101	256,226	229,435	240,142	242,203	220,785	206,249	199,059	230,138	226,681	216,674	245,383	238,639
Finland	361,008	303,945	298,833	295,036	280,474	294,419	269,784	267,044	273,993	253,757	238,712	233,234	273,549	270,272	257,606	275,079	249,633
Greece	319,516	267,348	257,067	243,569	219,053	218,449	191,210	207,329	213,396	200,310	193,044	194,587	233,972	236,560	238,992	283,178	296,660
Hungary	317,342	237,070	223,060	214,098	178,321	183,283	158,468	164,927	161,185	143,335	128,984	125,244	141,129	135,646	128,470	141,713	131,899
Ukraine	283,321	205,742	190,426	178,763	161,987	199,835	156,566	153,904	130,905	112,064	93,349	90,922	133,392	183,310	175,781	163,059	136,011
Slovakia	184,366	147,031	140,636	132,947	116,020	120,672	107,646	105,855	106,660	95,944	90,322	89,188	101,739	99,136	94,784	99,688	91,187
Bulgaria	150,310	117,007	112,232	102,434	90,719	84,477	70,658	68,639	66,318	59,288	53,929	50,766	57,081	55,820	54,297	57,682	50,690
Serbia	132,629	92,549	89,074	81,343	66,798	65,830	55,874	53,865	52,788	45,973	42,225	41,297	49,114	50,456	45,111	51,274	43,067
Croatia	126,466	98,951	92,506	84,416	71,260	69,055	57,919	61,472	61,694	56,166	52,640	51,012	59,628	59,854	57,585	62,889	59,032
Luxembourg	118,641	96,613	93,169	87,599	80,865	86,444	73,612	69,880	71,118	65,689	62,200	60,078	68,823	65,204	59,814	61,685	56,260
Lithuania	114,355	89,192	84,847	79,824	71,082	67,068	57,352	55,132	54,294	47,745	42,952	41,548	48,388	46,321	42,736	43,201	36,693
Azerbaijan	100,895	78,870	74,316	72,428	78,807	54,825	42,693	48,174	47,113	41,375	37,830	52,997	75,235	74,164	69,684	65,952	52,909
Slovenia	94,032	75,224	72,463	69,168	59,975	61,570	53,342	53,916	53,713	48,136	44,279	42,714	49,527	47,868	46,196	51,190	47,832
Belarus	87,879	71,561	71,180	71,792	73,735	68,207	61,312	64,414	60,011	54,723	47,703	56,329	78,736	75,496	65,669	61,368	57,220
Latvia	59,013	45,535	43,508	42,584	38,045	38,209	33,353	33,103	33,263	29,381	27,110	26,347	30,285	29,157	27,136	26,832	23,509
Estonia	57,366	45,004	42,752	41,303	38,406	37,229	31,795	31,877	31,237	27,460	24,554	23,314	27,063	25,451	23,252	23,300	19,569
Iceland	52,753	35,309	33,463	31,452	28,696	25,770	21,630	24,681	26,261	24,728	20,793	17,517	17,868	16,125	14,752	15,222	13,751
Cyprus	48,528	38,736	36,156	33,897	31,001	30,393	25,535	26,200	25,766	22,938	21,041	19,911	23,232	23,960	25,063	27,637	25,821
Georgia	45,246	35,353	33,775	30,778	24,985	18,849	16,013	17,645	17,905	16,472	15,445	15,223	17,966	17,516	16,894	15,475	12,425
Albania	37,683	28,372	27,259	23,388	19,185	18,086	15,271	15,582	15,337	13,209	12,003	11,525	13,404	12,936	12,470	13,052	12,079
Bosnia and Herzegovina	36,788	28,807	28,795	27,592	24,535	23,673	20,226	20,483	20,484	18,326	17,117	16,404	18,559	18,179	17,227	18,644	17,176
Malta	34,791	25,750	24,315	22,217	19,254	19,737	16,397	16,340	16,161	14,156	12,022	11,342	11,891	10,797	9,616	9,788	9,104
Armenia	33,319	26,258	25,533	24,086	19,514	13,879	12,642	13,619	12,458	11,527	10,546	10,553	11,610	11,121	10,619	10,142	9,260
Moldova	28,736	19,462	18,126	16,751	14,493	13,694	11,530	11,737	11,252	9,515	7,981	7,778	9,402	9,496	8,708	8,417	6,977
North Macedonia	23,618	17,885	16,679	15,772	13,957	14,008	12,385	12,609	12,694	11,336	10,686	10,067	11,378	10,824	9,751	10,499	9,415
Kosovo	15,069	11,274	11,151	10,470	9,375	9,418	7,728	7,900	7,882	7,178	6,681	6,296	7,076	6,735	6,167	6,340	5,348
Monaco				9,995	8,800	8,623	6,731	7,384	7,184	6,430	6,471	6,265	7,070	6,556	5,743	6,089	5,368
Liechtenstein					7,362	7,710	6,406	6,437	6,693	6,474	6,237	6,269	6,658	6,392	5,456	5,740	5,082
Montenegro	11,177	8,562	8,023	7,532	6,243	5,865	4,777	5,543	5,509	4,855	4,376	4,055	4,595	4,466	4,090	4,544	4,146
Andorra	4,732	4,035	4,038	3,786	3,376	3,325	2,885	3,155	3,217	2,993	2,895	2,789	3,267	3,193	3,189	3,625	3,446
San Marino	2,406	2,047	2,063	2,003	1,833	1,857	1,543	1,616	1,656	1,528	1,468	1,420	1,674	1,678	1,606	1,813	1,883

== See also ==
- List of sovereign states in Europe by GDP (nominal) per capita
- List of sovereign states in Europe by GDP (PPP)
- List of metropolitan areas in the European Union by GDP
- List of European countries by budget revenues
- List of European countries by fiscal balance
- Economy of Europe
- OSCE countries statistics
