= List of predecessors of sovereign states in Europe =

This is a list of all present sovereign states in Europe and their predecessors, according to the concept of succession of states. The political borders of Europe are difficult to define. The geographical borders between Europe and Asia are generally agreed to be the Caucasus Mountains, the Ural Mountains, the Black Sea, the Bosporus and the Dardanelles.

== List ==
Sovereign state	Predecessors
Albania	Illyrians; Illyrian kingdom (c. 650 - c. 135 BC) Part of the Roman Empire, within the province of Macedonia (148 BC – 324 AD); Part of the Byzantine Empire, within the province of Macedonia (324–1190); Principality of Arbanon (1190–1255) Byzantine Empire (1190–1204) Despotate of Epirus (1205–1255) Kingdom of Albania (1272–1368) Kingdom of Sicily (1258–1368) Lordship of Berat (1396–1417); Principality of Valona (1346–1417) Serbian Empire (1346–1355) Despotate of Angelokastron and Lepanto (1358–1374); Despotate of Arta (1359–1416); Princedom of Albania (1368–1392); Principality of Gjirokastër (1386–1418); Principality of Dukagjini (1387–1444); Principality of Kastrioti (1389–1444); Most Serene Republic of Venice (1420–1797); League of Lezhë (1444 – c. 1468); Ottoman Empire (1479–1912); Independent Albania (1912–1914); Principality of Albania (1914–1925); Albanian Republic (1925–1928); Albanian Kingdom (1928–1939); Italian protectorate of Albania (1939–1943); Albanian Kingdom (1943–1944); Democratic Government of Albania (1944–1946); People's Republic of Albania (1946–1976); People's Socialist Republic of Albania (1976–1991); Republic of Albania (1991–present)
Andorra	County of Urgell (843–1133); Roman Catholic Diocese of Urgell (1133–1208); County of Foix (1208–1607/1610); Principality of Catalonia (1173-1714); Principality of Andorra (1278–present)
Armenia	Kingdom of Armenia (331 BC – 428); Roman Armenia (114–118 AD); Sassanian (Persian) Armenia (252–299; 363–428; 428–646); Arminiya – Province (largely autonomous vassal principalities) of the Umayyad and Abbasid Caliphates (654–884); Bagratid Kingdom of Armenia (884–1045); Kingdom of Tashir-Dzoraget (dependent) (979–1118); Kingdom of Syunik (dependent) (987–1170); Kingdom of Artsakh (dependent) (1000–1261); Seljuq Armenia (1071–1124); Georgian Armenia (1124–1386): Zakarid Armenia (1201–1360); Ilkhanate (1260–1335); Principality of Khachen (1261–1603); Turkmen Armenia (1386–1502); Iranian Armenia (1502–1828): Safavid dynasty (1502–1736), Afsharid dynasty (1736–1796), Qajar dynasty (1789–1828); Ottoman Empire (1586–1828); Russian Empire (1828–1917); Transcaucasian Democratic Federative Republic (1918); Democratic Republic of Armenia (1918–1920); Armenian Soviet Socialist Republic (1920–1922); Federative Union of Socialist Soviet Republics of Transcaucasia (1922–1936)(republic of the Soviet Union); Armenian Soviet Socialist Republic (1936–1990) (republic of the Soviet Union); Republic of Armenia (1991–present) (republic of the Soviet Union to 1991)
Austria	Margraviate of Austria (976–1156); Duchy of Austria (1156–1453); Archduchy of Austria (1453–1804); Austrian Empire (1804–1867); Cisleithania (1867–1918); Republic of German-Austria (1918–1919); First Austrian Republic (1919–1934); Federal State of Austria (1934–1938); German Reich (1938–1945); Republic of Austria (1945–present)
Azerbaijan	Achaemenid Empire (549 – 331 BC); Caucasian Albania (2nd century BC – 705); Shirvanshah (861–1539); Kara Koyunlu (1375–1468); Aq Qoyunlu (1378–1501); Safavid Empire (1501–1736); Russian Empire (1813–1917); Transcaucasian Democratic Federative Republic (1918); Azerbaijan Democratic Republic (1918–1920); Azerbaijan Soviet Socialist Republic (1920–1922); Federative Union of Socialist Soviet Republics of Transcaucasia (1922–1936) (republic of the Soviet Union); Azerbaijan Soviet Socialist Republic (1936–1991) (republic of the Soviet Union); Republic of Azerbaijan (1991–present)
Belarus	Kievan Rus' (879–1240); Principality of Polotsk (987–1307); Principality of Turov (10th century – 14th century); Kingdom of Lithuania (1251–1263); Grand Duchy of Lithuania (1263–1569); Polish–Lithuanian Commonwealth (1569–1793); Russian Empire (1793–1917); Belarusian People's Republic (1918–1919); Socialist Soviet Republic of Byelorussia (1919; 1920–1922); Lithuanian–Belorussian Soviet Socialist Republic (1919–1920); Byelorussian Soviet Socialist Republic (1922–1991) (republic of the Soviet Union 1922–1991 and UN member 1945–1991); Republic of Belarus (1991–present)
Belgium	Burgundian Netherlands (1384–1482); Habsburg Netherlands (1482–1794) – Spanish Netherlands (1556–1713) and Austrian Netherlands (1713–1797); France (1797–1815); United Kingdom of the Netherlands (1815–1830); Kingdom of Belgium (1830–present)
Bosnia and Herzegovina	Banate of Bosnia (1154–1377); Kingdom of Bosnia (1377–1463); Ottoman Empire (1463–1878); Bosnia and Herzegovina (1878–1918); State of Slovenes, Croats and Serbs (1918); Kingdom of Serbs, Croats and Slovenes (1918–1929); Kingdom of Yugoslavia (1929–1943); Democratic Federal Yugoslavia (1943–1946); Socialist Federal Republic of Yugoslavia (1945–1992); Socialist Republic of Bosnia and Herzegovina (1945–1992); Republic of Bosnia and Herzegovina (1992–1995); Bosnia and Herzegovina (1995–present)
Bulgaria	Odrysian kingdom (480 BC – 30 BC) Paeonia (kingdom) Tylis (277 -212 BC); Thracian kingdom (Roman vassal state) (30 BC – 46 AD); Province of Thracia, Roman Empire (46–395); Eastern Roman Empire Province of Thracia (395–628); Eastern Roman Empire (628–680); Bulgars (Utigurs, Kutrigurs, Onogurs?) (469 – 632); Old Great Bulgaria (632–668); First Bulgarian Empire (681–1018) ::Eastern Roman Empire (1018–1185); Second Bulgarian Empire (1185–1396/1422); Despotate of Dobruja (1356 - 1411); Tsardom of Vidin (1356 - 1396); Ottoman Bulgaria (1396/1422–1878); Principality of Bulgaria (1878–1908) (sovereignty within Ottoman Empire); Kingdom of Bulgaria (1908–1946); People's Republic of Bulgaria (1946–1990); Republic of Bulgaria (1990–present)
Croatia	Littoral Croatian Duchy (7th century–925); Principality of Lower Pannonia (846–875); Kingdom of Croatia (925–1102); Kingdom of Croatia in personal union with the Kingdom of Hungary (1102–1526); Republic of Venice (1000–1797); Republic of Poljica (13th century–1807); Republic of Ragusa (1358–1808); Habsburg Monarchy (1527–1918); Kingdom of Croatia (1527–1868); Kingdom of Slavonia (1699–1868); Croatian Military Frontier (1553–1881); Slavonian Military Frontier (1702–1881); City of Fiume (1779–1918); Austrian Empire (1804–1867); Kingdom of Dalmatia (1815–1918); Margraviate of Istria (1849–1918); Austria-Hungary (1867–1918); Kingdom of Croatia-Slavonia (1868–1918); State of Slovenes, Croats and Serbs (1918); Kingdom of Serbs, Croats and Slovenes (1918–1929); Kingdom of Yugoslavia (1929–1941); Banovina of Croatia (1939–1941); Independent State of Croatia (1941–1945) (unrecognized); Socialist Federal Republic of Yugoslavia (1945–1992); Socialist Republic of Croatia (1945–1991); Republic of Croatia (1991–present)
Cyprus	Macedonian Empire (333–323 BC), Hellenistic States (323–58 BC) Roman Republic (58–27 BC), Roman Empire (27 BC – 395 AD)Byzantine Empire (395–1191); Kingdom of Cyprus (1192–1489 AD), Most Serene Republic of Venice (1489–1570) Ottoman Empire (1570–1914); Crown Colony of Cyprus (1914–1960); Republic of Cyprus (1960–present)
Czech Republic	Great Moravia (833–902); Duchy of Bohemia (c.870–1198); Kingdom of Bohemia (1198–1804); Austrian Empire (1804–1867); Cisleithania (1867–1918); Czechoslovak Republic (1918–1938); Czechoslovak Republic (1938–1939); German Reich (1939–1945) – Protectorate of Bohemia and Moravia (1939–1945); Czechoslovak Republic (1945–1960); Czechoslovak Socialist Republic (1960–1990); Czech and Slovak Federative Republic (1990–1992); Czech Republic (1993–present)
Denmark	Kingdom of Denmark (c. 965 – present); Anglo-Norse Empire (1016–1035); Kalmar Union (1397–1523)
Estonia	Terra Mariana (1207–1561) (Sweden) Swedish Empire (1561–1721) (Russian Empire) Governorate of Estonia (1721–1918); Estonian Soviet Socialist Republic (1940–1991) (de facto republic of the Soviet Union); Republic of Estonia (1918–present, legal succession; de facto 1918–1940 and 1991–present)
Finland	Kalmar Union (1397–1523); Sweden (c. 1210–1809) (Russian Empire) Grand Duchy of Finland (1809–1917); Republic of Finland (1917–present)
France	Part of the Roman Empire, within the province of Roman Gaul (1st century BC-5th century AD) Gallic Empire (260 - 274); Kingdom of the Franks (481–800); Carolingian Empire (800–843); West Francia (843–987); Lotharingia (855 - 959); Duchy of Normandy (911 - 1259); Duchy of Brittany (939–1532); Kingdom of France (987–1791); French Kingdom (1791–1792); French First Republic (1792–1804); First French Empire (1804–1814; 1815); Kingdom of France (1814–1815; 1815–1830); July Monarchy (1830–1848); French Second Republic (1848–1852); Second French Empire (1852–1870); French Third Republic (1870–1940); French State (1940–1944); Free France (1940–1944); Provisional Government of the French Republic (1944–1946); French Republic (1946–present)
Georgia	Kingdom of Abkhazia (778–1008); Kingdom of Iberia (c. 301 BC – 580); Principality of Iberia (580–891); Kingdom of the Iberians (mostly titular revival) (891–1008); Roman Empire Theme of Iberia (1001–1074) Kingdom of Georgia (1008–1465) Kingdom of Imereti (1463–1810) Kingdom of Kartli (1484–1762) Kingdom of Kakheti (1465–1762) Kingdom of Kartli-Kakheti (1762–1801) Russian Empire (1801–1917); Transcaucasian Democratic Federative Republic (1918); Democratic Republic of Georgia (1918–1921); Georgian Soviet Socialist Republic (1921–1922) (republic of the Soviet Union); Federative Union of Socialist Soviet Republics of Transcaucasia (1922–1936) (republic of the Soviet Union); Georgian Soviet Socialist Republic (1936–1990) (republic of the Soviet Union); Republic of Georgia (1990–1995) (republic of the Soviet Union to 1991); Georgia (1995–present)
Germany	Germanic tribes (5th century BC – 3rd century AD); Part of the Roman Empire, within the provinces of Germania Superior and Germania Inferior (83 AD – 475 AD); Alamannia (213 - 911); Old Saxony (6th century - 804); Carolingian Empire (800–843); East Francia (843–919); Kingdom of Germany (919–962) Holy Roman Empire (800/962–1806); Confederation of the Rhine (1806–1813) (client states of the French Empire) and Kingdom of Prussia (1701–1871); German Confederation (1815–1848); German Reich (1848–1849); German Confederation (1849–1866); North German Confederation (1866–1871); German Reich (1871–1918); German Reich (1919–1933) and Territory of the Saar Basin (1920–1935) (French League of Nations mandate); German Reich (1934–1945); Allied-occupied Germany (1945–1949); Federal Republic of Germany (West Germany) (1949–1990), West Berlin (1949–1990), Saar Protectorate (1947–1956) (French protectorate) and German Democratic Republic (East Germany) (1949–1990); Federal Republic of Germany (1990–present) (Modern Germany is a continuation of the Federal Republic, it is not a successor state)
Greece	Minoan civilisation (3500 - 1100 BC) Mycenaean Greece (1750 - 1050 BC) Ancient Greek city states and kingdoms (900–146 BC) Hellenic League (338–332 BC) Macedonian Empire (335–323 BC – Macedonian Kingdom existed since 808 BC) Delian League (488 - 404 BC); Aetolian League (4th century - 188 BC); Hellinistic States (323–146 BC); Achaean League (280 - 146 BC) Roman Republic (146–27 BC); Roman Empire (27 BC – 395 AD); Byzantine Empire (395–1204, 1261–1453), Despotate of Epirus (1205–1337, 1356–1479 Byzantine Successor), Crusader/Feudal/Latin States: Latin Empire of Constantinople (1204–1261), Duchy of Athens (1205–1458), Principality of Achaea (1205–1432), Genoa (1261–1566), Venice (c. 1200s–1479); Ottoman Empire (c.1300s–1920), Kingdom of Candia (1205–1669), Kingdom of the Morea (1688–1715), Ionian Islands under Venetian rule (1363–1797), French Republic (1797–1799 Ionian Islands), Septinsular Republic (1800–1815); Hellenic State (1822–1832) (named "Provisional Administration of Greece" from 1822–1828), United States of the Ionian Islands (1815–1864); Kingdom of Greece (1832–1924), Cretan State (1896–1913) (autonomous state of the Ottoman Empire), Free State of Icaria (1912); Hellenic Republic (1924–1935); Kingdom of Greece (1935–1941); Hellenic State (1941–1944) (Puppet state of Italy and Germany (1941–43), Puppet state of Germany (1943–44), Government in Exile (September–October 1944)); Kingdom of Greece (1944–1973); Hellenic Republic (1973–present)
Hungary	Principality of Hungary (895–1000); Kingdom of Hungary (1000–1526); Kingdom of Hungary (1526–1867); Eastern Hungarian Kingdom (1526–1551, 1556–1570), Principality of Transylvania (1570–1711), Grand Principality of Transylvania (1711–1848, 1849–1867); Hungarian State (1849); Kingdom of Hungary (1867–1918); Hungarian People's Republic (1918–1919); Hungarian Soviet Republic (1919); Hungarian Republic (1919–1920); Kingdom of Hungary (1920–1946); Hungarian Republic (1946–1949); Hungarian People's Republic (1949–1989); Republic of Hungary (1989–2012); Hungary (2012–present)
Iceland	Icelandic Free State (930–1262); Kingdom of Norway (1262–1397); Kalmar Union (1397–1536); Denmark–Norway (1536–1814); Kingdom of Denmark (1814–1918); Kingdom of Iceland (1918–1944); Iceland (1944–present)
Ireland	Hibernia (300 BC – 100 AD); Gaelic Kingdoms (1st century – 1541); Kingdom of Ireland (1542–1651); Commonwealth of England, Scotland and Ireland (1653–1659); Kingdom of Ireland (1659–1800); United Kingdom of Great Britain and Ireland (1801–1922); Irish Free State (1922–1937); Ireland (1937–present)
Italy	Etruscan city states (900 BC–27 BC), Magna Graecia (8th century - 212 BC), Latin League (8th century - 338 BC) Roman Kingdom (753 BC – 509 BC); Roman Republic (509–27 BC); Roman Empire (27 BC – 476 AD); Eastern Roman Empire (Byzantine Italy) (476–1071): Exarchate of Ravenna (584–751): Duchy of Rome (536–756); Kingdom of Italy (476–493) (Vassal state of the Eastern Roman Empire); Ostrogothic Kingdom (493–553); The Italian peninsula divided into many states 568–1861, among them: Kingdom of the Lombards (568–774); Republic of Venice (697–1797); Papal States (754–1870); Kingdom of the Franks (774–800); Carolingian Empire (800–843); Kingdom of Middle Francia (843–855); Kingdom of Italy (855–1801); Republic of Ancona (11th century - 1532); Republic of Genoa (11th century – 1797); Republic of Florence (1115 - 1569); Kingdom of Sicily (1130–1816); Kingdom of Naples (1282–1799, 1799–1816); Kingdom of Sardinia (1324–1861); Duchy of Milan (Imperial fief under Habsburg Spain) (1395–1447, 1450–1796); Duchy of Savoy (Imperial fief) (1416–1792, 1814–1847); Grand Duchy of Tuscany (1569–1801, 1814–1859, 1859–1860); Kingdom of Italy (1861–1946); Italian Social Republic (Republic of Salò) (1943–1945); Italian Republic (1946–present)
Kazakhstan	Cuman–Kipchak confederation (10th century – 1241) Golden Horde (1240s–1456); Kazakh Khanate (1456–1847); Russian Empire (1735/1860–1919); Alash Autonomy (1917–1920); Russian Soviet Federative Socialist Republic (a.k.a. Soviet Russia, 1919–1922); Kazakh Autonomous Socialist Soviet Republic (1920–1936), federated state of the Russian Soviet Federative Socialist Republic (1919–1936) (itself a republic of the Soviet Union after 1922); Kazakh Soviet Socialist Republic (1936–1991) (republic of the Soviet Union); Republic of Kazakhstan (1991–present)
Latvia	Terra Mariana (1207–1583); Polish–Lithuanian Commonwealth (1583–1611); Polish–Lithuanian Commonwealth and (Sweden) Swedish Empire (1611–1721); Polish–Lithuanian Commonwealth and Russian Empire (1721–1772); Russian Empire (1772–1918); Latvian Socialist Soviet Republic (1918–1920); Latvian Soviet Socialist Republic (1940–1991) (de facto republic of the Soviet Union); Republic of Latvia (1918–present, legal succession; de facto 1918–1940 and 1991–present)
Liechtenstein	Part of the Roman Empire, within the province of Raetia (15 BC–476 AD) Raetia Curiensis (476–11th century) Lordship of Schellenberg (9th century–1719) (within the Holy Roman Empire) County of Vaduz (1342-1719) (within the Holy Roman Empire) Principality of Liechtenstein (1719–present) (within the German Confederation 1815–1866)
Lithuania	Grand Duchy of Lithuania (13th century – 1569) Polish–Lithuanian Commonwealth (1569–1795); Russian Tsardom (1795–1812); French Occupation (1812); Russian Tsardom (1812–1914); German Occupation (1914–1918); Kingdom of Lithuania (1918); Republic of Lithuania (1918–1940); Lithuanian Soviet Socialist Republic (1940–1990/1991) (de facto republic of the Soviet Union); Republic of Lithuania (1918–present, legal succession; de facto 1918–1940 and 1990–present)
Luxembourg	Carolingian Empire (800–887) Middle Francia (843–855) Kingdom of Lotharingia (855–959) Duchy of Lorraine (959–1059) Holy Roman Empire Duchy of Lorraine (962–1766) (within the Holy Roman Empire) Duchy of Luxembourg (1353–1443/1797) (within the Holy Roman Empire) Kingdom of France(1766 –1815) Lorraine and Barrois (1766 –1790) French Republic (1792–1804) First French Empire (1804–1814; 1815) Kingdom of the Netherlands (1815–1890); Grand Duchy of Luxembourg (1890–present)
Malta	(Sovereign Military Order of Malta) Order of Saint John (1530–1798) (France) French occupation of Malta (1798–1800), La Nazione Gozitana (1798–1801) (United Kingdom) British Protectorate of Malta (1800–1813); Crown Colony of Malta (1813–1964); State of Malta (1964–1974); Republic of Malta (1974–present)
Moldova	Moldavia (1359–1812) (vassal of Ottoman Empire between 1514 and 1812); Russian Empire (1812–1918); Kingdom of Romania (1918–1945); Moldavian Soviet Socialist Republic (republic of the Soviet Union 1940–1990); Republic of Moldova (1991–present) (republic of the Soviet Union to 1991) Pridnestrovian Moldavian Soviet Socialist Republic (unrecognized republic of the Soviet Union 1990–1991); Pridnestrovian Moldavian Republic (1991–present)
Monaco	Republic of Genoa (1215–1297); Principality of Monaco (1297–present)
Montenegro	Principality of Serbia (768–960/971); First Bulgarian Empire (680–1018) (924–1018); Byzantine Empire (960–1043); Duklja (1043–1101); Serbian Grand Principality (1101–1217); Kingdom of Serbia (1217–1346); Serbian Empire (1346–1371); Principality of Zeta (1371–1402); Serbian Despotate (1402–1540); Ottoman Empire (1540–1852); Principality of Montenegro (1852–1910) (within Ottoman Empire until 1878); Kingdom of Montenegro (1910–1918); Kingdom of Serbia (1918); Kingdom of Serbs, Croats and Slovenes (1918–1929); Kingdom of Yugoslavia (1929–1943); Democratic Federal Yugoslavia (1943–1946); Socialist Federal Republic of Yugoslavia (1945–1992); Socialist Republic of Montenegro (1946–1992); Republic of Montenegro (1992–2006) (republic within the Federal Republic of Yugoslavia / Serbia and Montenegro) (2003–2006); Montenegro (2006–present)
Netherlands	Frankish Kingdom (5th to 10th centuries), Frisian Kingdom (600–734), Duchy of (Lower) Lorraine (903–1190) and County of Holland (880–1384); Burgundian Netherlands (1384–1482); Seventeen Provinces (1482–1581) (Dutch Republic) Republic of the Seven United Netherlands (1581–1795); Batavian Republic (1795–1806); Kingdom of Holland (1806–1810); First French Empire (1810–1813); Sovereign Principality of the United Netherlands (1813–1815); United Kingdom of the Netherlands (1815–1839); Kingdom of the Netherlands (1839–present)
North Macedonia	First Bulgarian Empire (681–1018); Byzantine Empire (1018–1185); Second Bulgarian Empire (1185–1346); Serbian Empire (1346–1371); Kingdom of Prilep (1371–1395); Ottoman Empire (1395–1913); Kingdom of Serbia (1913–1918); Kingdom of Bulgaria (1915–1918); Kingdom of Serbs, Croats and Slovenes (1918–1929); Kingdom of Yugoslavia (1929–1943); Democratic Federal Yugoslavia (1943–1946); Socialist Federal Republic of Yugoslavia (1945–1992); Socialist Republic of Macedonia (1945–1991); Republic of Macedonia (1991–2019); Republic of North Macedonia (2019–present)
Norway	Petty Kingdoms of Norway (?–876) Kingdom of Norway (872–1397); North Sea Empire (1016–1035); Kalmar Union (1397–1523); Denmark–Norway (1536–1814); Kingdom of Norway (1814); United Kingdoms of Sweden and Norway (1814–1905); Kingdom of Norway (1905–1940) Quisling Regime (puppet state) (1942–1945) Kingdom of Norway (1945–present)
Poland	Civitas Schinesghe (960–1025) – Poland in the Early Middle Ages; Kingdom of Poland (1025–1385); Kingdom of Poland (1385–1569); Polish–Lithuanian Commonwealth (1569–1795); Kingdom of Galicia and Lodomeria (1772–1804), Austrian Empire (1804–1867), Cisleithania (1867–1918), Duchy of Warsaw (1807–1815), Prussia and the Russian Empire (1795–1918); Kingdom of Poland (1916–1918); Second Polish Republic (1918–1939); Military Administration in Poland (1939); General Government (1939–1944); Provisional Government of the Republic of Poland (1944–1945); Provisional Government of National Unity (1945–1947); Polish People's Republic (1947–1989); Republic of Poland (1989–present)
Portugal	Roman Republic (197 BC – 27 BC); Roman Empire (27 BC – 476 AD); Suebic Kingdom (409 – 585); Visigothic Kingdom (418–711); Umayyad Caliphate (711–750); Emirate of Córdoba (756–868); County of Portugal, within the Kingdom of León (868–1139); Kingdom of Portugal (1139–1189); Kingdom of Portugal and Silves (1189–1191); Kingdom of Portugal (1191–1249); Kingdom of Portugal and the Algarve (1249–1471); Kingdom of Portugal and the Algarves (1471–1815); United Kingdom of Portugal, Brazil and the Algarves (1815–1825); Kingdom of Portugal and the Algarves (1825–1910); First Portuguese Republic (1910–1926); Ditadura Nacional (1926–1933); Second Portuguese Republic / Estado Novo (1933–1974); National Salvation Junta (1974–1975); Third Portuguese Republic (1975–present)
Romania	Wallachia (1330–1859; vassal of Ottoman Empire between 1415 and 1859); Moldavia (1359–1859; vassal of Ottoman Empire between 1514 and 1859); Romanian United Principalities (1859–1866); Principality of Romania (1866–1881); Kingdom of Romania (1881–1947); Socialist Republic of Romania (1947–1989) (renamed from "Romanian People's Republic" in 1965); Romania (1989–present)
Russia	Rus' Khaganate (838–862); Kievan Rus' (862–1240); Novgorod Republic (1136–1478); Vladimir-Suzdal (1157–1331; vassal of the Golden Horde 1240–1331); Pskov Republic (1348–1510); Principality of Tver (1246–1483); Grand Duchy of Moscow (1283–1547; vassal of the Golden Horde until 1480); Tsardom of Russia (1547–1610) Russian Empire (1612–1917); Russian Republic (1917); Russian Soviet Federative Socialist Republic (1917–1991) (republic of the Soviet Union 1922–1991); Union of Soviet Socialist Republics (1922–1991) (a federal state); Russian Federation (1991–present) (a federal state, currently have 89 federal subjects. Six federal subjects are not internationally recognized as part of Russia.)
San Marino	Republic of San Marino (301–present)
Serbia	Kingdom of Dardania(4th century BC – 28 BC); Part of the Roman Empire, within the provinces of Moesia, Pannonia and Dalmatia (75 BC – 481 AD); Principality of Serbia (768–960/971); First Bulgarian Empire (924–1018); Byzantine Empire (960–1043); Duklja (1043–1101); Serbian Grand Principality (1101–1217); Kingdom of Serbia (1217–1346); Serbian Empire (1346–1371); Moravian Serbia (1371–1402); Serbian Despotate (1402–1459); Kingdom of Serbia (1718–1739 and 1788–1791); Principality of Serbia (1817–1882); Kingdom of Serbia (1882–1918); Kingdom of Serbs, Croats and Slovenes (1918–1929); Kingdom of Yugoslavia (1929–1941); Socialist Federal Republic of Yugoslavia (1945–1992); Socialist Republic of Serbia (1946–1992); Federal Republic of Yugoslavia (1992–2003); Republic of Serbia (1992–2006); State Union of Serbia and Montenegro (2003–2006); Republic of Serbia (2006–present) Socialist Autonomous Province of Kosovo (1946–1992); Republic of Kosova (1990–1999); Autonomous Province of Kosovo and Metohija (1992–present); United Nations Interim Administration Mission in Kosovo (1999–present); Republic of Kosovo (2008–present)
Slovakia	Czechoslovak Republic (1918–1938); Czechoslovak Republic (1938–1939); Slovak Republic (1939–1945); Czechoslovak Republic (1945–1960); Czechoslovak Socialist Republic (1960–1990); Czech and Slovak Federative Republic (1990–1992); Slovak Republic (1993–present)
Slovenia	Duchy of Carniola (1364–1804); Austrian Empire (1804–1867); Cisleithania (1867–1918); State of Slovenes, Croats and Serbs (1918); Kingdom of Serbs, Croats and Slovenes (1918–1929); Kingdom of Yugoslavia (1929–1943); Democratic Federal Yugoslavia (1943–1946); Socialist Federal Republic of Yugoslavia (1945–1992); Socialist Republic of Slovenia (1946–1991); Republic of Slovenia (1991–present)
Spain	Vascones (12th BC? – 1st BC); Tartessos (12th BC – 5th BC); Phoenicias (12th BC – 237 BC); Greeks (9th BC – 218 BC); Iberians (6th BC – 1st BC); Celts (6th BC – 1st BC); Celtiberics (6th BC – 1st BC); Lusitanians (6th BC – 1st BC); Carthaginian Empire (237 BC – 208 BC); Roman Republic (218 BC – 27 BC); Roman Empire (27 BC – 476 AD); Vandals (409–534); Alans (409–429); Kingdom of the Suebi (409–585); Visigothic Kingdom (418–711); Byzantine Empire (552–624); Umayyad Caliphate (Al-Andalus) (711–756); Emirate of Córdoba (756–929); Caliphate of Córdoba (929–1031); First Taifas period (1031-1085); Almoravid empire (1085-1144); Second Taifas period (1144-1172); Almohad Caliphate (1172-1212); Third Taifas period (1212-1238); Nasrid Kingdom of Granada (1238-1492); Kingdom of Asturias (718/722–924); Kingdom of Galicia (910–1833); Kingdom of León (910–1230); Kingdom of Navarre (824 (traditional)–1841); County of Barcelona (formation 801/independence 988–1162); Kingdom of Aragon (1035–1707); Kingdom of Castile (1065–1230); Crown of Aragon (1162–1716); Principality of Catalonia (1162–1714); Crown of Castile (1230–1715); Kingdom of Majorca (1231–1715(1349)); Kingdom of Valencia (1238–1707); Unification of Spain and Spanish Empire (1469/1492/1516–1975); Kingdom of Spain (1716–1873); Spanish Republic (1873–1874); Kingdom of Spain (1873–1931); Spanish Republic (1931–1939); Spanish State (1939–1975); Kingdom of Spain (1975–present)
Sweden	Kingdom of Sweden (c.1000–1397); Kalmar Union (1397–1523); Kingdom of Sweden (1523–1814); United Kingdoms of Sweden and Norway (1814–1905); Kingdom of Sweden (1905–present)
Switzerland	Kingdom of the Burgundians (411–534); Kingdom of the Franks (481–843); Middle Francia (843 – 855); East Francia (843 – 962); Old Swiss Confederacy (1291–1798); Helvetic Republic (1798–1803); Swiss Confederation (1803–present)
Turkey	Hellinistic States (323–146 BC); Roman Republic (146–27 BC), Roman Empire (27 BC – 395 AD), Byzantine Empire (395–1390) Seljuq Empire (1037–1194); Sultanate of Rum (1077–1307); Karamanids (1250–1487); Ottoman Empire (1299–1923); Republic of Turkey (1923–present)
Ukraine	Rus' Khaganate (838–862) Kievan Rus' (862–1240); Principality of Kyiv (1132–1471; vassal of the Golden Horde 1301–1362); Kingdom of Galicia–Volhynia (1199–1349); Polish–Lithuanian Commonwealth ( Kyiv (1471–1793), Bratslav (1566–1793), Chernihiv (1635–1654), Ruthenian (1434–1772), Podolian (1434–1793), Volhynian (1569–1795), and Belz (1462–1793) Voivodeships); Cossack Hetmanate (1648–1764); Russian Empire (1764–1917); Kingdom of Galicia and Lodomeria (1772–1804), Austrian Empire (1804–1867), Cisleithania (1867–1918); Ukrainian People's Republic (1917–1921), West Ukrainian People's Republic (1918–1919); Ukrainian Soviet Socialist Republic (1919–1922, republic of the Soviet Union 1922–1991 and UN member 1945–1991)
Ukraine	In the Crimean peninsula Greek city states (6th–5th centuries BC); Bosporan Kingdom (c. 438 BC – 107 BC); Kingdom of Pontus (107 BC – 527 AD); Roman Empire (63 BC – 341 AD); Byzantine Empire (341–1204); Empire of Trebizond (1204–1461); Golden Horde (1238–1449); Principality of Theodoro (1461–1475); Crimean Khanate (1443–1783); Ottoman Empire (1475–1774); Russian Empire (1783–1917) wartime governments (1917–1921); Russian SFSR (1921–1922); Soviet Union (1922–1954); Ukrainian Soviet Socialist Republic (1954–1991)
Ukraine	Ukraine (1991–present)
United Kingdom	Part of the Roman Empire, within the province of Roman Britain (43 AD-410 AD) Kingdom of Elmet (4th–7th century), Kingdom of Deira (c.450–654), Kingdom of Kent/Cantwara (455–871), Kingdom of Lindsey (c. 500 – 7th century), Kingdom of Rheged (500–600), Kingdom of Sussex (c.477–860), Kingdom of Wessex (519 – 927), Kingdom of Essex (527–825), Kingdom of Mercia (527–918), Kingdom of Haestingas (6th century? – 771?), Kingdom of East Anglia (571–918), Kingdom of the Hwicce (577–780s), Kingdom of Bernicia (6th century – 654), Kingdom of Northumbria (654–954), Kingdom of England (927–1649); Anglo-Norse Empire (1016–1035); Angevin Empire (1154 - 1214); Kingdom of Gwent (5th century–1075), Kingdom of Gwynedd (5th century – 1216), Ergyng (5th–7th century), Kingdom of Deheubarth (920–1197), Kingdom of Glywysing (5th century - c. 1000), Kingdom of Brycheiniog (c. 450 - c. 1045), Kingdom of Ceredigion, Kingdom of Powys (5th century - 1160), Kingdom of Dyfed (c.410 - 920), Kingdom of Seisyllwg (680–920); Principality of Wales (1216–1542); Pictland, Dál Riata, Kingdom of Strathclyde (5th century – c. 1030), Kingdom of Scotland (843–1651); Early Medieval Irish Kingdoms, Lordship of Ireland (1171–1541), Kingdom of Ireland (1542–1651); Commonwealth of England (1649–1653); Commonwealth of England, Scotland and Ireland (1653–1659); Commonwealth of England (1659–1660); Kingdom of Ireland (1659–1800), Kingdom of Scotland (1659–1707) and Kingdom of England (1660–1707); Kingdom of Ireland and Kingdom of Great Britain (1707–1800); United Kingdom of Great Britain and Ireland (1801–1927); United Kingdom of Great Britain and Northern Ireland (1927–present)
Vatican City	Roman Republic (509–27 BC); Roman Empire (27 BC – 476 AD); Kingdom of Italy (476–493); Ostrogothic Kingdom (493–533); Byzantine Empire (533–754); Papal States (754–1798; 1799–1870); Roman Republic (1798–1799) (client state of France); Kingdom of Italy (1870–1929) (as a prisoner in the Vatican); Vatican City State (1929–present)

== See also ==
- List of European sovereign states and dependent territories
- Succession of states
