= List of European countries by fiscal balance =

This is a list of sovereign states in Europe by their consolidated fiscal balance as a percentage of Gross domestic product, including an average for the European Union.

Country	Consolidated fiscal balance (% of GDP)	Date	Frequency
Albania	−3.7	2022	yearly
Andorra	4.9	2022	assumed yearly
Armenia	−1.4	Jun 2023	quarterly
Austria	−4.1	Jun 2023	quarterly
Azerbaijan	0.4	Jun 2021	monthly
Belarus	−0.4	Sep 2021	quarterly
Belgium	−3.9	2022	yearly
Bosnia and Herzegovina	4.7	Mar 2023	quarterly
Bulgaria	−1.3	Jun 2023	quarterly
Croatia	−2.6	2021	yearly
Cyprus	3.4	Jun 2023	quarterly
Czech Republic	−3.3	Jun 2023	quarterly
Denmark	3.2	Jun 2023	quarterly
Estonia	−1.7	Jun 2023	quarterly
European Union	−3.3	2022	yearly
Finland	−1.5	Jun 2023	quarterly
France	−5.0	Jun 2023	quarterly
Georgia	−2.0	Jun 2023	quarterly
Germany	−3.4	Jun 2023	quarterly
Greece	−1.3	Dec 2018	monthly
Hungary	−8.2	Jun 2023	quarterly
Iceland	−1.5	Jun 2023	quarterly
Ireland	2.2	Jun 2023	quarterly
Italy	−8.0	Jun 2023	quarterly
Kazakhstan	−3.5	Jun 2023	quarterly
Kosovo Kosovo	0.5	Jun 2023	quarterly
Latvia	−3.0	Jun 2023	quarterly
Liechtenstein	2.7	2021	assumed yearly
Lithuania	−1.3	Jun 2023	quarterly
Luxembourg	−0.3	2022	yearly
Malta	−4.8	Mar 2023	quarterly
Moldova	−3.3	2022	yearly
Monaco	−1	2011	–
Montenegro	−0.5	Jun 2023	quarterly
Netherlands	−0.1	Mar 2023	quarterly
North Macedonia	−4.5	2022	yearly
Norway	24.0	Jun 2023	quarterly
Poland	−3.7	2022	yearly
Portugal	0.0	Jun 2023	yearly
Romania	−6.3	Jun 2023	quarterly
Russia	−4.7	Jun 2023	quarterly
San Marino	0.9	2022	assumed yearly
Serbia	−2.1	Jun 2023	quarterly
Slovakia	−6.2	2020	yearly
Slovenia	−3.0	Jun 2023	quarterly
Spain	−4.4	Jun 2023	quarterly
Sweden	0.7	2022	yearly
Switzerland	1.2	2022	yearly
Ukraine	16.3	Dec 2022	quarterly
United Kingdom	−7.3	Jun 2023	quarterly
Vatican City	–	–	–

== See also ==
- List of sovereign states in Europe by GDP (PPP)
- List of U.S. states and territories by GDP
- List of metropolitan areas in the European Union by GDP
- List of European countries by budget revenues
- List of European countries by budget revenues per capita
- List of countries in Europe by military expenditures
- Economy of Europe
- World economy
- OSCE countries statistics
