= Jesenice, Croatia =

Jesenice
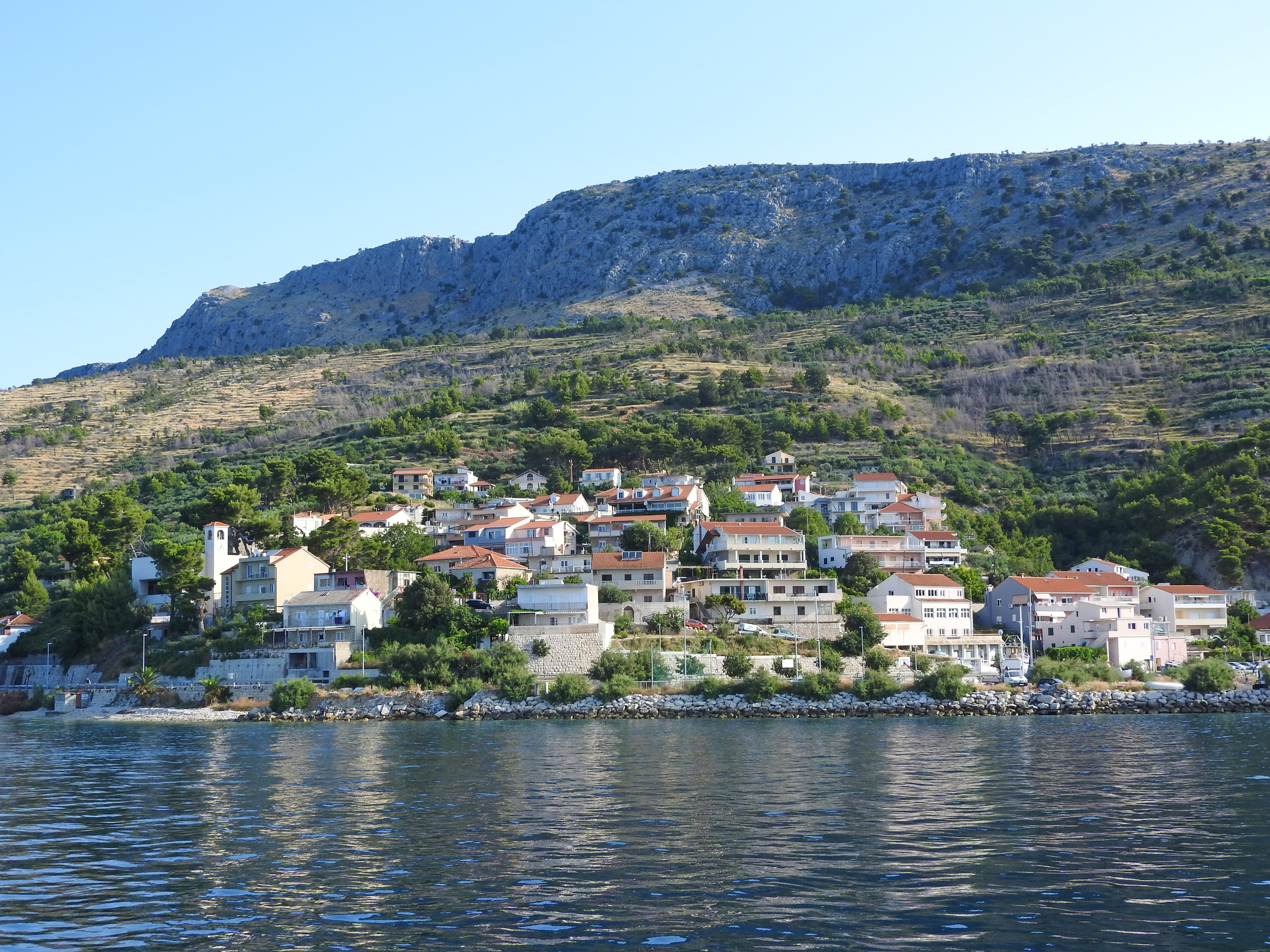
- View of Jesenice

- Location within Croatia
- Coordinates: 43.462°N 16.598°E
- Country: Croatia
- County: Split-Dalmatia
- Municipality: Dugi Rat

Area
  - Total: 5.8 km^{2} (2.2 sq mi)

Population (2021)
  - Total: 1,978
  - Density: 340/km^{2} (880/sq mi)
- Time zone: UTC+1 (CET)
  - Summer (DST): UTC+2 (CEST)

Jesenice is a settlement near Dugi Rat, Croatia, population 2,089 (census 2011). It consists of the villages of Bajnice, Krilo, Orij, and Suhi Potok.
