= Dugi Rat =

- Municipality
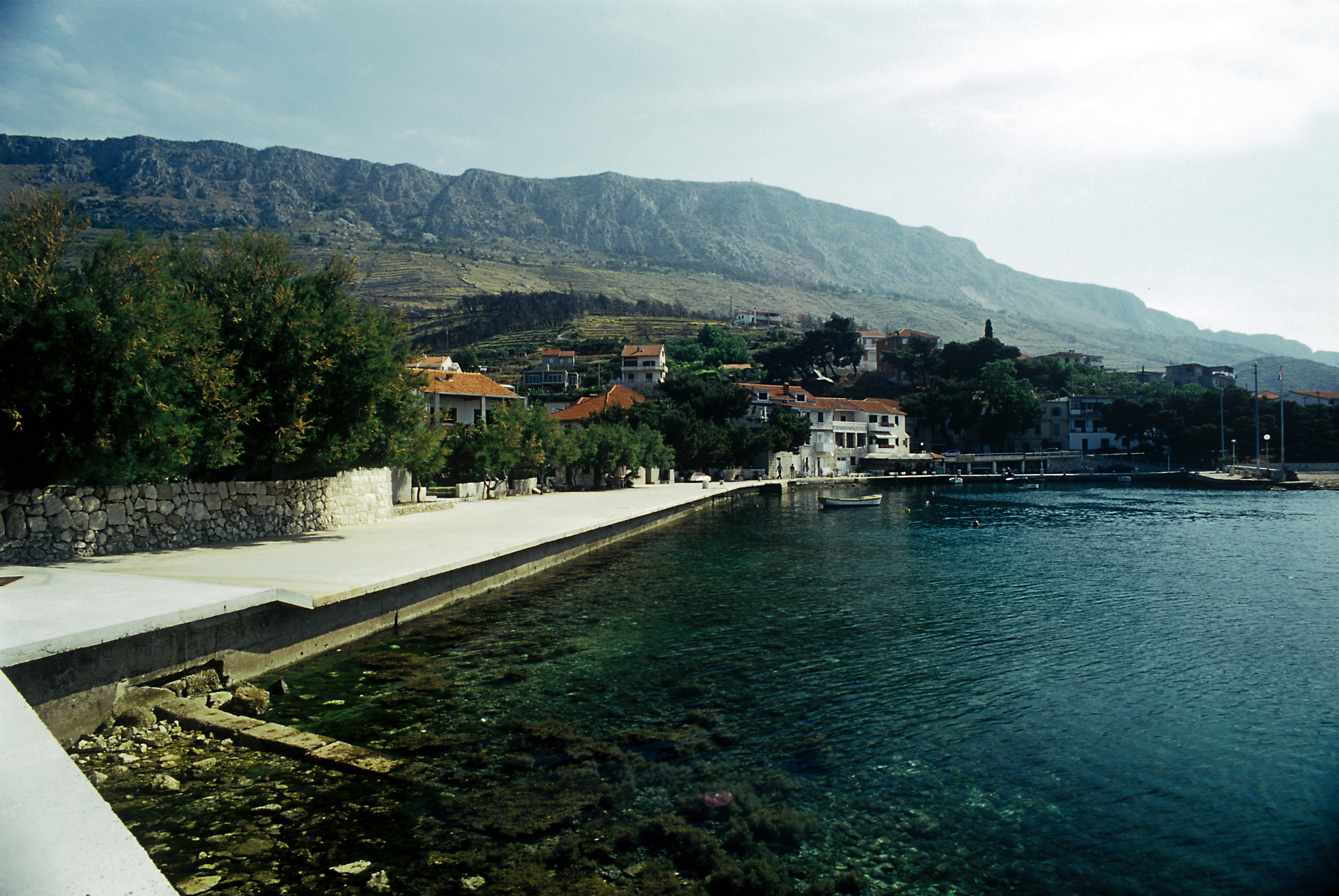

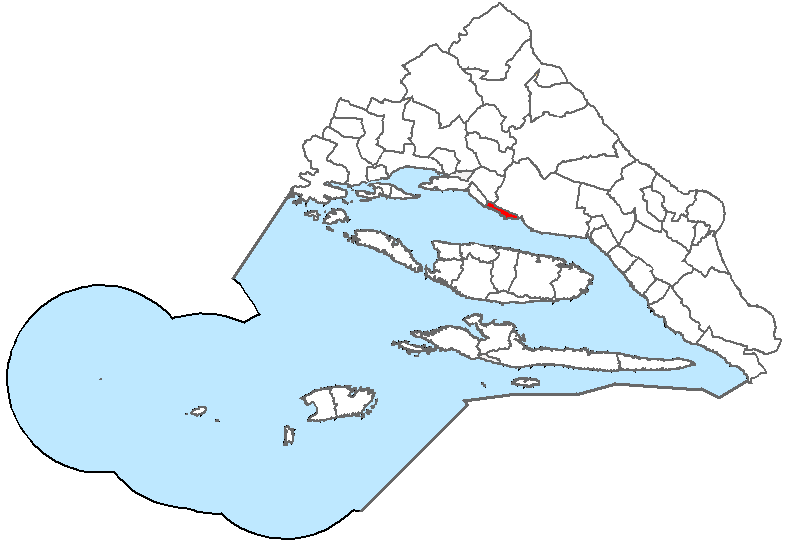

- Location within Croatia
- Coordinates: 43°27′N 16°38′E
- Country: Croatia
- Region: Dalmatia
- County: Split-Dalmatia County

Area
  - Municipality: 11.0 km^{2} (4.2 sq mi)
  - Urban: 1.8 km^{2} (0.69 sq mi)

Population (2021)
  - Municipality: 6,876
  - Density: 625/km^{2} (1,620/sq mi)
  - Urban: 3,338
  - Urban density: 1,900/km^{2} (4,800/sq mi)
- Time zone: UTC+1 (CET)
  - Summer (DST): UTC+2 (CEST)
- Website: dugirat.hr

Dugi Rat is a village and a municipality in Croatia in the Split-Dalmatia County. In Croatian dugi rat means "long cape".

== Demographics ==
In the 2011 census, it had a total population of 7,092, in the following settlements:

- Duće, population 1,561
- Dugi Rat, population 3,442
- Jesenice, population 2,089

In the same census, 98% were Croats.

Dugi Rat: Population trends 1857–2021
v

population	825	1050	1050	1212	1462	1633	1660	2433	2401	2646	3170	3683	4920	6544	7305	7092	6876
	1857	1869	1880	1890	1900	1910	1921	1931	1948	1953	1961	1971	1981	1991	2001	2011	2021

Sources: Croatian Bureau of Statistics publications
