= List of sovereign states and dependent territories in Europe =

Overview of European countries

The list below includes all entities falling even partially under any of the various common definitions of Europe, geographical or political. Fifty generally recognised sovereign states, Kosovo with limited, but substantial, international recognition, and four largely unrecognised de facto states with limited to no recognition have territory in Europe and/or membership in international European organisations. There are eight entities that are not integral parts of a European state or have special political arrangements.

== Boundary of Europe ==
=== Geographical ===
Under the commonly used geographic definition, the boundary between the continents of Asia and Europe stretches along the Ural Mountains, the Ural River, and the Caspian Sea in the east, the Greater Caucasus mountain range, the Black Sea, and the Turkish Straits (including the Bosporus, the Sea of Marmara, and the Dardanelles), in the south. Based on such a commonly used division of the continents, the transcontinental countries of Azerbaijan, Georgia, Kazakhstan, Russia, and Turkey have territory in both Asia and Europe.

The island of Cyprus in West Asia is close to Anatolia (a.k.a. Asia Minor) but is often considered to be a part of Europe and is a member of the European Union. Like Cyprus, Armenia is also entirely in West Asia but is a member of several European organisations.

Although the Mediterranean Sea provides a clearer divide between Africa and Europe, some traditionally European islands such as Malta, Pantelleria, the Pelagian Islands, and a part of Sicily are actually located on the African Plate. The island of Iceland is a part of the Mid-Atlantic Ridge, straddling the Eurasian Plate and the North American Plate.

Some territories which are geographically outside of Europe have strong connections with European states. Greenland, for example, has socio-political connections with Europe and is part of the Kingdom of Denmark but is located closer to the continent of North America and is usually grouped with that continent.

Other territories are part of European countries but are geographically located on other continents, such as the French overseas regions, the Spanish Canary Islands and the autonomous cities of Ceuta and Melilla on the coast of Africa, and the Dutch BES islands of Bonaire, Sint Eustatius, and Saba in the Caribbean.

=== Political ===
The political boundaries of Europe vary with the definition of Europe that is used by different political organisations. For instance, the Council of Europe and the European Court of Human Rights include 46 countries in their definition of Europe. The European Higher Education Area includes 48 countries, and the European Cultural Convention and the European Olympic Committees include 50 countries in their definitions.

== Sovereign states ==
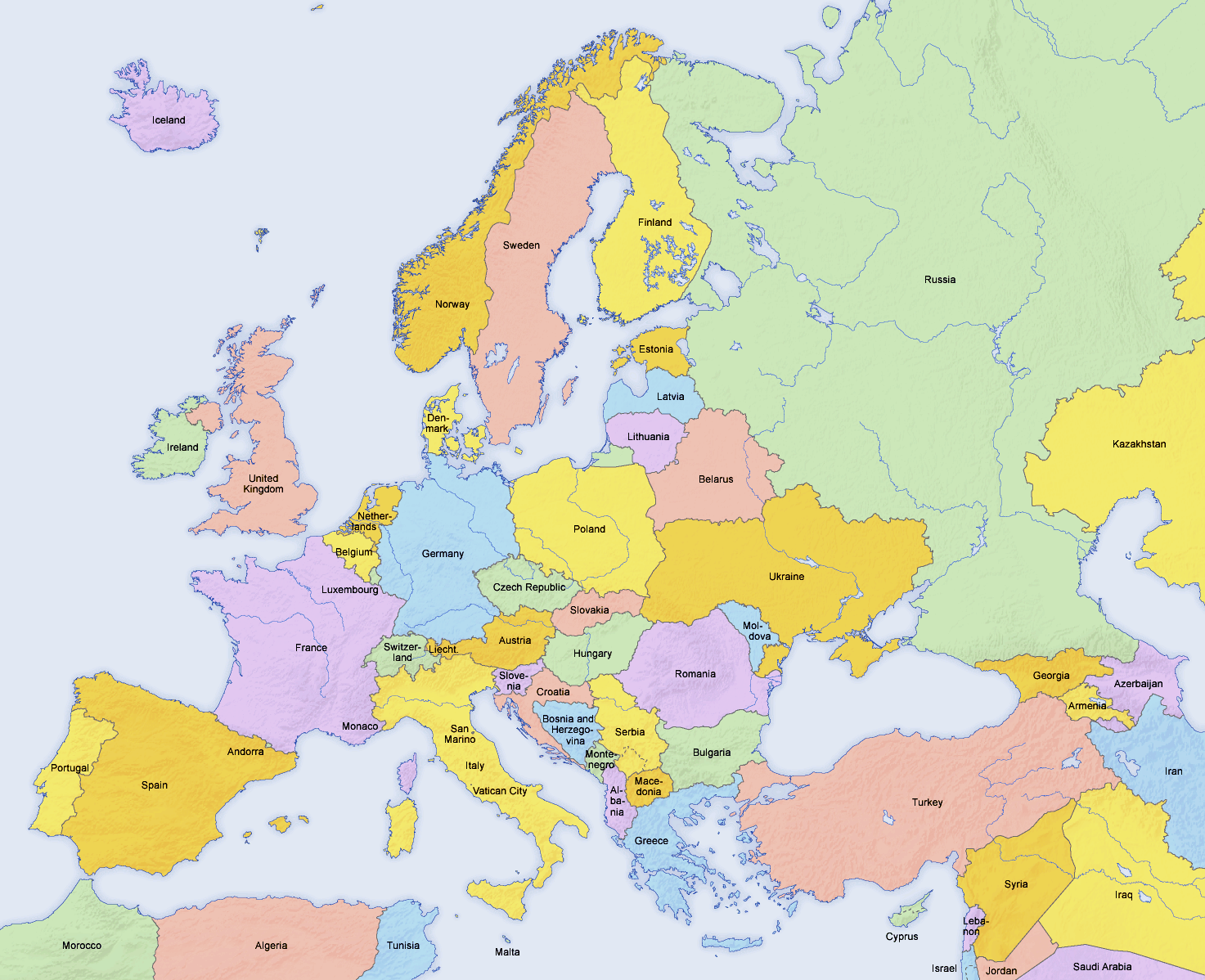
Political map of Europe and the surrounding region

A sovereign state is a political association with effective sovereignty over a population for whom it makes decisions in the national interest. According to the Montevideo Convention, a state must have a permanent population, a defined territory, a government, and the capacity to enter into relations with other states.

=== UN member states and UNGA non-member observer state ===
There are 50 sovereign states with territory located within the common definition of Europe and/or membership in international European organisations that are almost universally recognised internationally. All are either member states of the United Nations or non-member observer states at the United Nations General Assembly (UNGA), and all except Belarus, Kazakhstan, Russia, and Vatican City are members of the Council of Europe. 44 countries have their capital city located within Europe, and (as of 2022) 27 of those countries are member states of the European Union, which means that they are highly integrated with one another and share their sovereignty through EU institutions. There are currently nine states recognised as candidate countries for membership in the European Union. Seven of these nine states are located in Europe (Albania, Bosnia and Herzegovina, Moldova, Montenegro, North Macedonia, Serbia, and Ukraine), while two have territories in both Asia and Europe (Georgia and Turkey).

Each entry in the list below has a map of its location in Europe. Territory in Europe is shown in dark-green; territory not geographically in Europe is shown in a lighter shade of green. The lightest shade of green represents other states in the EU and is shown on the maps of all territories within the EU. For candidate members of the EU, see potential enlargement of the European Union.

Flag	Map	English short, formal names, and ISO	Domestic short and formal name(s)	Capital	Population 2021	Area (Note: Area and population numbers include integral areas located outside of Europe. The area and population of states with separatist regions includes that of the separatist regions.)	Currency	EU Membership
Flag of Albania	Map showing Albania in Europe	Albania Republic of Albania ALB	Albanian: Shqipëri / Shqipëria – Republika e Shqipërisë	Tirana Albanian: Tiranë	2,854,710	28,748 km^{2} (11,100 sq mi)	Albanian lek	Candidate negotiating
Flag of Andorra	Map showing Andorra in Europe	Andorra Principality of Andorra AND	Catalan: Andorra – Principat d'Andorra	Andorra la Vella Catalan: Andorra la Vella	79,034	468 km^{2} (181 sq mi)	Euro	No
Flag of Armenia	Map showing Armenia in Europe	Armenia (Note: Part of the South Caucasus, at the crossroads of Europe and Asia. Physiographically, Armenia falls entirely in Western Asia, while Georgia and Azerbaijan are mostly in Asia with small portions north of the Caucasus Mountains divide in Europe.) Republic of Armenia ARM	Armenian: Հայաստան – Հայաստանի Հանրապետություն (Hayastan – Hayastani Hanrapetut'yun)	Yerevan Armenian: Երևան (Yerevan)	2,790,974	29,743 km^{2} (11,484 sq mi)	Armenian dram	No
Flag of Austria	Map showing Austria in Europe	Austria Republic of Austria AUT	German: Österreich – Republik Österreich	Vienna German: Wien	8,922,082	83,871 km^{2} (32,383 sq mi)	Euro	Yes
Flag of Azerbaijan	Map showing Azerbaijan in Europe	Azerbaijan Republic of Azerbaijan AZE	Azerbaijani: Azǝrbaycan – Azǝrbaycan Respublikası	Baku Azerbaijani: Bakı	10,312,992	86,600 km^{2} (33,436 sq mi)	Azerbaijani manat	No
Flag of Belarus	Map showing Belarus in Europe	Belarus Republic of Belarus BLR	Belarusian: Беларусь – Рэспубліка Беларусь (Biełaruś – Respublika Biełaruś) Russian: Беларусь – Республика Беларусь (Belarus' — Respublika Belarus')	Minsk Belarusian: Мінск (Minsk) Russian: Минск (Minsk)	9,578,167	207,600 km^{2} (80,155 sq mi)	Belarusian rouble	No
Flag of Belgium	Map showing Belgium in Europe	Belgium Kingdom of Belgium BEL	Dutch: België – Koninkrijk België French: Belgique – Royaume de Belgique German: Belgien – Königreich Belgien	Brussels Dutch: Brussel French: Bruxelles German: Brüssel	11,611,419	30,528 km^{2} (11,787 sq mi)	Euro	Yes
Flag of Bosnia and Herzegovina	Map showing Bosnia and Herzegovina in Europe	Bosnia and Herzegovina BIH	Bosnian: Bosna i Hercegovina Croatian: Bosna i Hercegovina Serbian: Босна и Херцеговина	Sarajevo Bosnian: Sarajevo Croatian: Sarajevo Serbian: Сарајево (Sarajevo)	3,270,943	51,197 km^{2} (19,767 sq mi)	Bosnia and Herzegovina convertible mark	Candidate
Flag of Bulgaria	Map showing Bulgaria in Europe	Bulgaria Republic of Bulgaria BGR	Bulgarian: България – Република България (Bulgaria – Republika Bulgaria)	Sofia Bulgarian: София (Sofia)	6,885,868	110,879 km^{2} (42,811 sq mi)	Euro	Yes
Flag of Croatia	Map showing Croatia in Europe	Croatia Republic of Croatia HRV	Croatian: Hrvatska – Republika Hrvatska	Zagreb Croatian: Zagreb	4,060,135	56,594 km^{2} (21,851 sq mi)	Euro	Yes
Flag of Cyprus	Map showing Cyprus in Europe	Cyprus (Note: The island of Cyprus is located on the Cyprian arc on the edge of the Anatolian Plate and is physiographically associated with Asia, but it is part of European organisations such as the EU.) Republic of Cyprus CYP	Greek: Κύπρος – Κυπριακή Δημοκρατία (Kýpros – Kypriakí Dimokratía) Turkish: Kıbrıs – Kıbrıs Cumhuriyeti	Nicosia Greek: Λευκωσία (Lefkosía) Turkish: Lefkoşa	1,244,188	9,251 km^{2} (3,572 sq mi)	Euro	Yes
Flag of the Czech Republic	Map showing the Czech Republic in Europe	Czechia (Note: A simpler official short name has been encouraged by the Czech government, "Czechia". By 2017, this variant remains uncommon. Nevertheless, this term has been adopted by several companies and organisations, including Google Maps, instead of the term "Czech Republic". See Name of the Czech Republic.) Czech Republic CZE	Czech: Česko – Česká republika	Prague Czech: Praha	10,510,751	78,867 km^{2} (30,451 sq mi)	Czech koruna	Yes
Flag of Denmark	Map showing Denmark in Europe	Denmark (Note: Denmark and the Netherlands are constituent countries of the Kingdom of Denmark and the Kingdom of the Netherlands respectively. Both are members of the EU; however, the other constituent countries of their kingdoms are not. In international organisations, the terms Denmark and the Netherlands are often used as short names for their respective kingdoms as a whole.) Kingdom of Denmark DNK	Danish: Danmark – Kongeriget Danmark	Copenhagen Danish: København	5,854,240	42,933 km^{2} (16,577 sq mi)	Danish krone	Yes
Flag of Estonia	Map showing Estonia in Europe	Estonia Republic of Estonia EST	Estonian: Eesti – Eesti Vabariik	Tallinn Estonian: Tallinn	1,328,701	45,228 km^{2} (17,463 sq mi)	Euro	Yes
Flag of Finland	Map showing Finland in Europe	Finland Republic of Finland FIN	Finnish: Suomi – Suomen tasavalta Swedish: Finland – Republiken Finland	Helsinki Finnish: Helsinki Swedish: Helsingfors	5,535,992	338,145 km^{2} (130,559 sq mi)	Euro	Yes
Flag of France	Map showing France in Europe	France French Republic FRA	French: France – République française	Paris French: Paris	64,531,444	643,427 km^{2} (248,429 sq mi)	Euro	Yes
Flag of Georgia	Map showing Georgia in Europe	Georgia GEO	Georgian: საქართველო (Sakartvelo)	Tbilisi / T'bilisi Georgian: თბილისი (T'bilisi)	3,757,980	69,700 km^{2} (26,911 sq mi)	Georgian lari	Candidate
Flag of Germany	Map showing Germany in Europe	Germany Federal Republic of Germany DEU	German: Deutschland – Bundesrepublik Deutschland	Berlin German: Berlin	83,408,554	357,022 km^{2} (137,847 sq mi)	Euro	Yes
Flag of Greece	Map showing Greece in Europe	Greece Hellenic Republic GRC	Greek: Ελλάδα – Ελληνική Δημοκρατία (Elláda – Ellinikí Dimokratía)	Athens Greek: Αθήνα (Athína)	10,445,365	131,957 km^{2} (50,949 sq mi)	Euro	Yes
Flag of Hungary	Map showing Hungary in Europe	Hungary HUN	Hungarian: Magyarország	Budapest Hungarian: Budapest	9,709,786	93,028 km^{2} (35,918 sq mi)	Hungarian forint	Yes
Flag of Iceland	Map showing Iceland in Europe	Iceland ISL	Icelandic: Ísland – Lýðveldið Ísland	Reykjavík Icelandic: Reykjavík	370,335	103,000 km^{2} (39,769 sq mi)	Icelandic króna	No
Flag of Ireland	Map showing Ireland in Europe	Ireland (Note: The terms Republic of Ireland and Poblacht na hÉireann are official descriptions but are not official names.) IRL	English: Ireland Irish: Éire	Dublin Irish: Baile Átha Cliath	4,986,526	70,273 km^{2} (27,133 sq mi)	Euro	Yes
Flag of Italy	Map showing Italy in Europe	Italy Italian Republic ITA	Italian: Italia – Repubblica Italiana	Rome Italian: Roma	59,240,329	301,340 km^{2} (116,348 sq mi)	Euro	Yes
Flag of Kazakhstan	Map showing Kazakhstan in Europe	Kazakhstan (Note: Kazakhstan and Turkey both have territory in both Europe (dark green) and Asia (light green).) Republic of Kazakhstan KAZ	Kazakh: Қазақстан – Қазақстан Республикасы (Qazaqstan – Qazaqstan Respūblīkasy) Russian: Казахстан – Республика Казахстан (Kazakhstan – Respublika Kazakhstan)	Astana Kazakh: Астана (Astana) Russian: Астана (Astana)	19,196,465	2,724,900 km^{2} (1,052,090 sq mi)	Kazakhstani tenge	No
Flag of Latvia	Map showing Latvia in Europe	Latvia Republic of Latvia LVA	Latvian: Latvija – Latvijas Republika	Riga Latvian: Rīga	1,873,919	64,589 km^{2} (24,938 sq mi)	Euro	Yes
Flag of Liechtenstein	Map showing Liechtenstein in Europe	Liechtenstein Principality of Liechtenstein LIE	German: Liechtenstein – Fürstentum Liechtenstein	Vaduz German: Vaduz	39,039	160 km^{2} (62 sq mi)	Liechtenstein franc	No
Flag of Lithuania	Map showing Lithuania in Europe	Lithuania Republic of Lithuania LTU	Lithuanian: Lietuva – Lietuvos Respublika	Vilnius Lithuanian: Vilnius	2,786,651	65,300 km^{2} (25,212 sq mi)	Euro	Yes
Flag of Luxembourg	Map showing Luxembourg in Europe	Luxembourg Grand Duchy of Luxembourg LUX	German: Luxemburg – Großherzogtum Luxemburg French: Luxembourg – Grand-Duché de Luxembourg Luxembourgish: Lëtzebuerg – Groussherzogtum Lëtzebuerg	Luxembourg German: Luxemburg French: Luxembourg Luxembourgish: Lëtzebuerg	639,321	2,586 km^{2} (998 sq mi)	Euro	Yes
Flag of Malta	Map showing Malta in Europe	Malta Republic of Malta MLT	English: Malta – Republic of Malta Maltese: Malta – Repubblika ta' Malta	Valletta Maltese: Valletta	526,748	316 km^{2} (122 sq mi)	Euro	Yes
Flag of Moldova	Map showing Moldova in Europe	Moldova Republic of Moldova MDA	Romanian: Moldova – Republica Moldova	Chișinău Romanian: Chișinău	3,061,506	33,851 km^{2} (13,070 sq mi)	Moldovan leu	Candidate negotiating
Flag of Monaco	Map showing Monaco in Europe	Monaco Principality of Monaco MCO	French: Monaco – Principauté de Monaco	Monaco French: Monaco	36,686	2 km^{2} (0.8 sq mi)	Euro	No
Flag of Montenegro	Map showing Montenegro in Europe	Montenegro MNE	Montenegrin: Црна Гора (Crna Gora)	Podgorica Montenegrin: Подгорица (Podgorica)	627,859	13,812 km^{2} (5,333 sq mi)	Euro	Candidate negotiating
Flag of the Netherlands	Map showing the Netherlands in Europe	Netherlands (Note: The Netherlands is also known as "Holland", but this name properly refers only to a region of the country. See Netherlands (terminology).) Kingdom of the Netherlands NLD	Dutch: Nederland – Koninkrijk der Nederlanden	Amsterdam (capital) Dutch: Amsterdam The Hague (seat of government) Dutch: 's-Gravenhage / Den Haag	17,501,696	41,543 km^{2} (16,040 sq mi)	Euro	Yes
Flag of North Macedonia	Map showing North Macedonia in Europe	North Macedonia Republic of North Macedonia MKD	Macedonian: Северна Македонија – Република Северна Македонија (Severna Makedonija – Republika Severna Makedonija)	Skopje Macedonian: Скопје (Skopje)	2,103,330	25,713 km^{2} (9,928 sq mi)	Macedonian denar	Candidate negotiating
Flag of Norway	Map showing Norway in Europe	Norway Kingdom of Norway NOR	Bokmål: Norge – Kongeriket Norge Nynorsk: Noreg – Kongeriket Noreg	Oslo Norwegian: Oslo	5,403,021	323,802 km^{2} (125,021 sq mi)	Norwegian krone	No
Flag of Poland	Map showing Poland in Europe	Poland Republic of Poland POL	Polish: Polska – Rzeczpospolita Polska	Warsaw Polish: Warszawa	38,307,726	312,685 km^{2} (120,728 sq mi)	Polish złoty	Yes
Flag of Portugal	Map showing Portugal in Europe	Portugal Portuguese Republic PRT	Portuguese: Portugal – República Portuguesa	Lisbon Portuguese: Lisboa	10,290,103	92,090 km^{2} (35,556 sq mi)	Euro	Yes
Flag of Romania	Map showing Romania in Europe	Romania ROU	Romanian: România	Bucharest Romanian: București	19,328,560	238,391 km^{2} (92,043 sq mi)	Romanian leu	Yes
Flag of Russia	Map showing Russia in Europe	Russia Russian Federation RUS	Russian: Россия – Российская Федерация (Rossija – Rossijskaja Federacija)	Moscow Russian: Москва (Moskva)	145,102,755	17,098,242 km^{2} (6,601,668 sq mi)	Russian rouble	No
Flag of San Marino	Map showing San Marino in Europe	San Marino Republic of San Marino SMR	Italian: San Marino – Repubblica di San Marino	San Marino Italian: San Marino	33,745	61 km^{2} (24 sq mi)	Euro	No
Flag of Serbia	Map showing Serbia in Europe	Serbia Republic of Serbia SRB	Serbian: Србија – Република Србија (Srbija – Republika Srbija)	Belgrade Serbian: Београд (Beograd)	7,296,769	88,361 km^{2} (34,116 sq mi)	Serbian dinar	Candidate negotiating
Flag of Slovakia	Map showing Slovakia in Europe	Slovakia Slovak Republic SVK	Slovak: Slovensko – Slovenská republika	Bratislava Slovak: Bratislava	5,447,622	49,035 km^{2} (18,933 sq mi)	Euro	Yes
Flag of Slovenia	Map showing Slovenia in Europe	Slovenia Republic of Slovenia SVN	Slovene: Slovenija – Republika Slovenija	Ljubljana Slovene: Ljubljana	2,119,410	20,273 km^{2} (7,827 sq mi)	Euro	Yes
Flag of Spain	Map showing Spain in Europe	Spain Kingdom of Spain ESP	Spanish: España – Reino de España	Madrid Spanish: Madrid	47,486,935	505,370 km^{2} (195,124 sq mi)	Euro	Yes
Flag of Sweden	Map showing Sweden in Europe	Sweden Kingdom of Sweden SWE	Swedish: Sverige – Konungariket Sverige	Stockholm Swedish: Stockholm	10,467,097	450,295 km^{2} (173,860 sq mi)	Swedish krona	Yes
Flag of Switzerland	Map showing Switzerland in Europe	Switzerland Swiss Confederation CHE	German: Schweiz – Schweizerische Eidgenossenschaft French: Suisse – Confédération suisse Italian: Svizzera – Confederazione Svizzera Romansh: Svizra – Confederaziun svizra	Bern / Berne German: Bern French: Berne Italian and Romansh: Berna	8,691,406	41,277 km^{2} (15,937 sq mi)	Swiss franc	No
Flag of Turkey	Map showing Turkey in Europe	Turkey Republic of Türkiye TUR	Turkish: Türkiye – Türkiye Cumhuriyeti	Ankara Turkish: Ankara	84,775,404	783,562 km^{2} (302,535 sq mi)	Turkish lira	Candidate with frozen negotiations
Flag of Ukraine	Map showing Ukraine in Europe	Ukraine UKR	Ukrainian: Украïна (Ukraïna)	Kyiv Ukrainian: Київ (Kyiv)	43,531,422	603,550 km^{2} (233,032 sq mi)	Ukrainian hryvnia	Candidate negotiating
Flag of the United Kingdom	Map showing the UK in Europe	United Kingdom (Note: The United Kingdom consists of the countries of England, Northern Ireland, Scotland and Wales. The UK is responsible for the foreign relations and ultimate good governance of the Crown Dependencies of Guernsey, the Isle of Man and Jersey, which are otherwise separate. England, Scotland and Wales make up the island of Great Britain (or simply Britain), which is sometimes used synonymously with the United Kingdom.) United Kingdom of Great Britain and Northern Ireland GBR	English: United Kingdom – United Kingdom of Great Britain and Northern Ireland	London	67,281,039	243,610 km^{2} (94,058 sq mi)	Sterling	No
Flag of the Vatican City	Map showing Vatican City in Europe	Vatican City Vatican City State VAT	Italian: Città del Vaticano – Stato della Città del Vaticano Latin: Status Civitatis Vaticanae	Vatican City Italian: Città del Vaticano	511	0.49 km^{2} (0.19 sq mi)	Euro	No

=== De facto states ===
The following five entities in Europe have partial diplomatic recognition by one or more UN member states (and therefore are defined as states by the constitutive theory of statehood) or have no diplomatic recognition by any UN member state but are defined as states by the declarative theory of statehood. None are members of the UN, Council of Europe or EU.

Flag	Map	English common and formal names	Status	Domestic common and formal names	Capital	Population	Area
Flag of Abkhazia	Map showing Abkhazia in Europe	Abkhazia Republic of Abkhazia	Claimed as an autonomous republic of Georgia. Recognised by four UN member states.	Abkhaz: Аҧсны – Аԥсны Аҳәынҭқарра (Apsny – Apsny Ahwyntqarra) Russian: Абхазия – Республика Абхазия (Abhaziya – Respublika Abkhaziya)	Sukhumi Abkhaz: Аҟəа (Akwa) Russian: Суху́м(и) (Sukhum(i))	250,000	8,660 km^{2} (3,344 sq mi)
Flag of Kosovo	Map showing Kosovo in Serbia	Kosovo Republic of Kosovo	Claimed by Serbia. Has been recognised as sovereign by 110 UN member states.	Albanian: Kosova / Kosovë – Republika e Kosovës Serbian: Косово – Република Косово (Kosovo – Republika Kosovo)	Pristina Albanian: Prishtina, Prishtinë Serbian: Приштина (Priština)	1,836,529	10,887 km^{2} (4,203 sq mi)
Flag of Northern Cyprus	Map showing Northern Cyprus in Europe	Northern Cyprus Turkish Republic of Northern Cyprus	Claimed as part of the Republic of Cyprus. Recognised by Turkey.	Turkish: Kuzey Kıbrıs – Kuzey Kıbrıs Türk Cumhuriyeti	North Nicosia Turkish: Lefkoşa	294,906	3,355 km^{2} (1,295 sq mi)
Flag of South Ossetia	Map showing South Ossetia in Europe	South Ossetia Republic of South Ossetia	Claimed as part of Georgia. Recognised by four UN member states.	Iron Ossetic: Хуссар Ирыстон – Республикӕ Хуссар Ирыстон (Khussar Iryston – Respublikæ Khussar Iryston) Russian: Южная Осетия – Республика Южная Осетия (Yuzhnaya Osetiya – Respublika Yuzhnaya Osetiya)	Tskhinvali Iron Ossetic: Цхинвал or Чъреба (Chreba) Russian: Цхинва́л(и) (Tskhinvál(i))	56,000	3,900 km^{2} (1,506 sq mi)
Flag of Transnistria	Map showing Transnistria in Moldova	Transnistria / Trans-Dniester Pridnestrovian Moldavian Republic	Claimed as a territorial unit of Moldova. De facto independent state, recognised by two non-UN states.	Romanian: Transnistria – Republica Moldovenească Nistreană Russian: Приднестровье – Приднестровская Молдавская Республика (Pridnestrov'ye – Pridnestrovskaya Moldavskaya Respublika) Ukrainian: Придністров'я – Придністровська Молдавська Республіка (Prydnistrovia – Pridnistrovska Moldavska Respublika)	Tiraspol Romanian: Tiraspol Russian: Тираcполь (Tiraspol') Ukrainian: Тирасполь (Tyraspol)	347,251	3,500 km^{2} (1,351 sq mi)

== Non-sovereign territories ==
=== Dependent territories ===
The following six European entities are dependent territories.

Flag	Map	English common and formal names	Legal status	Domestic common and formal names	Capital	Population	Area
Flag of the United Kingdom, as used in Akrotiri and Dhekelia	Map showing Akrotiri and Dhekelia in Europe	Akrotiri and Dhekelia Sovereign Base Areas of Akrotiri and Dhekelia	British Overseas Territory	English: Akrotiri and Dhekelia – Sovereign Base Areas of Akrotiri and Dhekelia Greek: Ακρωτήρι και Δεκέλεια – Περιοχές Κυρίαρχων Βάσεων Ακρωτηρίου και Δεκέλειας (Akrotíri ke Dekélia – Periochés Kyríarchon Váseon Akrotiríou ke Dekélias)	Episkopi Cantonment Greek: Φρουρά Επισκοπής (Frourá Episkopís)	15,700	254 km^{2} (98 sq mi)
Flag of the Faroe Islands	Map showing the Faroe Islands in Europe	Faroe Islands / Faeroe Islands	Autonomous territory in the Kingdom of Denmark	Faroese: Føroyar Danish: Færøerne	Tórshavn Faroese: Tórshavn Danish: Thorshavn	54,000	1,393 km^{2} (538 sq mi)
Flag of Gibraltar	Map showing Gibraltar in Europe	Gibraltar	British Overseas Territory	English: Gibraltar	Gibraltar	29,185	6.5 km^{2} (2.5 sq mi)
Flag of Guernsey	Map showing Guernsey in relation to the United Kingdom	Guernsey Bailiwick of Guernsey	Crown Dependency in right of Guernsey	English: Guernsey – Bailiwick of Guernsey French: Guernesey – Bailliage de Guernesey Guernésiais: Guernési – Bailliage de Guernési	Saint Peter Port French: Saint Pierre Port Guernésiais: Saint Pierre Port	65,849	78 km^{2} (30 sq mi)
Flag of the Isle of Man	Map showing the Isle of Man in Europe	Isle of Man	Crown Dependency in right of Man	English: Isle of Man Manx: Mannin – Ellan Vannin	Douglas Manx: Doolish	86,866	572 km^{2} (221 sq mi)
Flag of Jersey	Map showing Jersey in Europe	Jersey Bailiwick of Jersey	Crown Dependency in right of Jersey	English: Jersey – Bailiwick of Jersey French: Jersey – Bailliage de Jersey Jèrriais: Jèrri – Bailliage de Jèrri	Saint Helier French: Saint-Hélier Jèrriais: Saint Hélyi	96,513	118 km^{2} (46 sq mi)

=== Areas of special sovereignty ===
The following places are considered integral parts of their sovereign state, but have a political arrangement that was decided through an international agreement.

*	= A part of the EU, although there may be some special arrangements.

Flag	Map	English common and formal names	Legal status	Domestic common and formal names	Capital	Population	Area
Flag of Åland	Map showing Åland in Europe	Åland^{*} Åland Islands	Self-governing area of Finland, significant autonomy as the result of the Åland crisis	Swedish: Åland – Landskapet Åland	Mariehamn Swedish: Mariehamn	27,500	6,787 km^{2} (2,620 sq mi)
Flag of the United Kingdom, as Northern Ireland hasn't had an official flag, since 1972	Map showing Northern Ireland in the United Kingdom and Europe	Northern Ireland	Part of the United Kingdom, devolved government determined by the Good Friday Agreement	English: Northern Ireland Irish: Tuaisceart Éireann Scots: Norlin Airlann	Belfast	1,810,863	14,130 km^{2} (5,456 sq mi)
Flag of Norway, as used in Svalbard	Map showing Svalbard in Europe	Svalbard	Special territory of Norway, determined by the Svalbard Treaty	Norwegian: Svalbard	Longyearbyen Norwegian: Longyearbyen	2,019	62,045 km^{2} (23,956 sq mi)

== See also ==
- International organisations in Europe
- Lists of European countries:
  - by area
  - by GDP
    - by GDP per capita
    - by GDP PPP
  - by population
- List of former sovereign states in Europe
- Predecessors of sovereign states in Europe
- Regions of Europe
