= Kostanje =

Settlement in Split-Dalmatia County, Croatia

- Settlement
- Interactive map of Kostanje
- Location of Kostanje in Croatia
- Coordinates: 43°26′25″N 16°50′02″E
- Country: Croatia
- County: Split-Dalmatia
- City: Omiš

Area
  - Total: 9.7 km^{2} (3.7 sq mi)

Population (2021)
  - Total: 572
  - Density: 59/km^{2} (150/sq mi)
- Time zone: UTC+1 (CET)
  - Summer (DST): UTC+2 (CEST)
- Postal code: 21310 Omiš
- Area code: +385 (0)21

Kostanje is a settlement in the City of Omiš in Croatia. In 2021, its population was 572.

== Geography ==
Kostanje consists of the hamlets: Amulići, Begići, Bilići, Bliznaci, Gojsalići, Juriševići, Jurjevići, Mandalinići, Matijevići, Mladinovići, Radovčići, Šezdan, Šimanovići, Tičinovići and Vladinovići. Administratively, Marasovići is also under Kostanje, but it is closer to Podgrađe. The hamlets surround a number of karst dolines and doline-terraced valleys. For instance, Bliznaci, Mandalinići, Begići, Tičinovići and Radovčići surround the main polje of Ponikve. Radovčići, Tičinovići and Bilići surround its western polje.

== Demographics ==
Kostanje: Population trends 1857–2021
v

| population | 558 | 764 | 611 | 605 | 706 | 812 | 822 | 903 | 1033 | 1049 | 1044 | 1028 | 867 | 775 | 658 | 605 | 572 |
| | 1857 | 1869 | 1880 | 1890 | 1900 | 1910 | 1921 | 1931 | 1948 | 1953 | 1961 | 1971 | 1981 | 1991 | 2001 | 2011 | 2021 |

Sources: Croatian Bureau of Statistics publications
