= Poljica Statute =

Legal statute of the Republic of Poljica

The Poljica Statute is the most important historical source for the Republic of Poljica. First mentioned in the late 14th century, and preserved in codified form since the 15th century, the statute determined the law of Poljica, which is, by its form, style, content and establishment of social-economic relations, totally different from the rest of Croatian statutes.

It is written in short, picturesque sentences that include the norms of Poljica's society from those regarding the highest political authorities to those that include all Poljicians' interests. Besides the laws written in this statute, the Poljica Statute also contains various decisions and verdicts of authority that, in a few occasions, refer to individuals.

The Poljica Statute was changed as the society of Poljica changed. Another important value of the Poljica Statute is its archaic form, which can be used to study the people from Poljica and those from Croatia in general at the time it was formulated. Typical features of the Poljica Statute are guarantees of freedom but also acceptance of responsibility to protect Poljica.

== Dating ==
The statute had various redactions. With possible uncodified customary law of Poljica dating to the 13th century, the first probable mention of existence of a codified statute is from 1383 (sometimes wrongly dated to the 1333) letter by Elizabeth of Bosnia wife of king Louis I of Hungary. In the letter published in Zadar and sent to Stephen II Lackfi the Ban of Croatia, is mentioned complaining of the citizens of Split that the citizens of Poljica insist to abide and judge by their own laws, hence queen ordered that the ban sues them according to the Croatian laws and not their own laws. The oldest preserved redaction, with first 18 articles usually dated to 1440, mentions that was made from an older one, and since 1475 was updated with new redactions.

== Basic features ==
The Poljica Statute is a document of priceless value. Besides matters of law, it is useful to study historical, economical, political and other social relations from that time. The law of Poljica was based on customary laws of Croatia and was influenced by church, feudal, Roman and commercial law. In the Poljica Statute, a clear difference was made between public and individual rights. Public rights were manifested in the relations between serfs and their masters and in the impossibility for citizens to be elected to the Table of Poljica (the government).

The Statute had little influence on citizens, because they had village autonomy inside of their districts, so they had, through their village princes, an influence on election of new princes, and there were almost no serfs. Laws for serfs were very strict, and for some violations commoners were more severely punished than nobles. For example, if a tenant cursed his landlord his tongue was cut out, and if he dared to rise a hand against him, his right arm would be chopped off.

== Script ==
The earliest redaction from the 15th century Poljica Statute is written in Cyrillic (Bosančica) under influence of Glagolitic script.

== Language ==
The language of the redactions is a mixture of steadily receding Čakavian dialect and increasingly mode widespread Štokavian dialect (specifically Western Ikavian) and, given that Glagolite clergymen contributed to the text, a considerable number of Church Slavonicisms are present. In the statute and other public and private documents from Poljica both the script and language are called as Croatian.

== See also ==
- Republic of Poljica

== Sources ==
- Laušić, Ante (1991). Postanak i razvitak Poljičke kneževine: (do kraja XV. stoljeća) [The inception and development of the Principality of Poljica (up to the end of the 15th century)] (in Croatian). Split: Književni krug. ISBN 86-7397-082-2.
