= Organization for Security and Co-operation in Europe statistics =

State (52)	GNI	Wage	UN	CoE	OSCE	EU	EEA	CU	Schengen	€	OECD	WTO	ESA	NATO	ICC	VWP
Albania	4,050	392	UN	CoE	OSCE	Candidate			EU visa-free	ALL		WTO		NATO	ICC	39.6
Andorra	41,130		UN	CoE	OSCE			EUCU	EU visa-free	€		obs			ICC	VWP
Armenia	3,700		UN	CoE	OSCE	CIS	EAEU	EACU	CIS visa-free	AMD		WTO		CSTO / PfP	ICC	48.9
Austria	46,850	2,758	UN	CoE	OSCE	EU	EEA	EUCU	Schengen	€	OECD	WTO	ESA	PfP	ICC	VWP
Azerbaijan	4,840		UN	CoE	OSCE	CIS			CIS visa-free	AZN	GUAM	obs		PfP		14.0
Belarus	5,540	528	UN	obs	OSCE	CIS	EAEU	EACU	CIS visa-free	BYR		obs	BSA	CSTO		15.5
Belgium	45,310	2,464	UN	CoE	OSCE	EU	EEA	EUCU	Schengen	€	OECD	WTO	ESA	NATO	ICC	VWP
Bosnia and Herzegovina	5,900	490	UN	CoE	OSCE	Applicant			EU visa-free	BAM		obs		MAP	ICC	13.9
Bulgaria	8,770	1,000	UN	CoE	OSCE	EU	EEA	EUCU	EU visa-free	BGN / €2024		WTO	BSA	NATO	ICC	17.8
Croatia	13,810	1,020	UN	CoE	OSCE	EU	EEA	EUCU	Schengen	€	Applicant	WTO		NATO	ICC	5.3
Cyprus	26,940	2,235	UN	CoE	OSCE	EU	EEA	EUCU	EU visa-free	€		WTO	CA		ICC	1.4
Czech Republic	17,310	1,081	UN	CoE	OSCE	EU	EEA	EUCU	Schengen	CZK	OECD	WTO	ESA	NATO	ICC	VWP
Denmark	58,930	3,226	UN	CoE	OSCE	EU	EEA	EUCU	Schengen	DKK	OECD	WTO	ESA	NATO	ICC	VWP
Estonia	14,060	1,437	UN	CoE	OSCE	EU	EEA	EUCU	Schengen	€	OECD	WTO	ESA	NATO	ICC	VWP
Finland	45,680	2,758	UN	CoE	OSCE	EU	EEA	EUCU	Schengen	€	OECD	WTO	ESA	NATO	ICC	VWP
France	42,680	2,468	UN	CoE	OSCE	EU	EEA	EUCU	Schengen	€	OECD	WTO	ESA	NATO	ICC	VWP
(Georgia (country)) Georgia	3,530	209	UN	CoE	OSCE	Applicant			EU visa-free	GEL	GUAM	WTO		PfP	ICC	49.7
Germany	42,560	2,754	UN	CoE	OSCE	EU	EEA	EUCU	Schengen	€	OECD	WTO	ESA	NATO	ICC	VWP
Greece	28,630	1,851	UN	CoE	OSCE	EU	EEA	EUCU	Schengen	€	OECD	WTO	ESA	NATO	ICC	VWP
Hungary	12,980	1,233	UN	CoE	OSCE	EU	EEA	EUCU	Schengen	HUF	OECD	WTO	ECS	NATO	ICC	VWP
Iceland	43,220	5,891	UN	CoE	OSCE		EEA		Schengen	ISK	OECD	WTO		NATO	ICC	VWP
(Republic of Ireland) Ireland	44,310	2,733	UN	CoE	OSCE	EU	EEA	EUCU		€	OECD	WTO	ESA	PfP	ICC	VWP
Israel	42,800		UN						EU visa-free	ILS	OECD	WTO	CA	MD		
Italy	35,080	1,967	UN	CoE	OSCE	EU	EEA	EUCU	Schengen	€	OECD	WTO	ESA	NATO	ICC	VWP
Kazakhstan	6,740	425	UN	appl	OSCE	CIS	EAEU	EACU	CIS visa-free	KZT		obs	KazCosmos	CSTO		12.2
Kosovo	3,240	123		appl		Potential candidate				€						29.0
Latvia	12,390	1,153	UN	CoE	OSCE	EU	EEA	EUCU	Schengen	€	OECD	WTO	ECS	NATO	ICC	VWP
Liechtenstein	113,210		UN	CoE	OSCE		EEA		Schengen	CHF		WTO			ICC	VWP
Lithuania	15,080	1,035	UN	CoE	OSCE	EU	EEA	EUCU	Schengen	€	OECD	WTO	CA	NATO	ICC	VWP
Luxembourg	74,430	3,636	UN	CoE	OSCE	EU	EEA	EUCU	Schengen	€	OECD	WTO	ESA	NATO	ICC	VWP
Malta	16,690	1,188	UN	CoE	OSCE	EU	EEA	EUCU	Schengen	€	Applicant	WTO	CA	PfP	ICC	VWP
Moldova	2,590	249	UN	CoE	OSCE	CIS / Candidate			EU visa-free / CIS visa-free	MDL	GUAM	WTO		PfP	ICC	41.3
Monaco	163,000		UN	CoE	OSCE			EUCU	Schengen ^{2}	€					sign	VWP
Montenegro	7,150	699	UN	CoE	OSCE	Candidate			EU visa-free	€		WTO		NATO	ICC	27.5
Netherlands	49,350	2,673	UN	CoE	OSCE	EU	EEA	EUCU	Schengen	€	OECD	WTO	ESA	NATO	ICC	VWP
North Macedonia	5,900	490	UN	CoE	OSCE	Candidate			EU visa-free	MKD		WTO		NATO	ICC	21.5
Norway	86,440	5,382	UN	CoE	OSCE		EEA		Schengen	NOK	OECD	WTO	ESA	NATO	ICC	VWP
Poland	12,260	1,337	UN	CoE	OSCE	EU	EEA	EUCU	Schengen	PLN	OECD	WTO	ESA	NATO	ICC	VWP
Portugal	20,940	1,405	UN	CoE	OSCE	EU	EEA	EUCU	Schengen	€	OECD	WTO	ESA	NATO	ICC	VWP
Romania	10,330	715	UN	CoE	OSCE	EU	EEA	EUCU	EU visa-free	RON	Applicant	WTO	ESA	NATO	ICC	25.0
Russia	9,370	675	UN	CoE	OSCE	CIS	EAEU	EACU	CIS visa-free	₽		WTO	RSA	CSTO		4.9
San Marino	50,670		UN	CoE	OSCE			EUCU	Schengen ^{2}	€					ICC	VWP
Serbia	7,570	561	UN	CoE	OSCE	Candidate			EU visa-free	RSD		obs		PfP	ICC	11.0
Slovakia	16,130	1,389	UN	CoE	OSCE	EU	EEA	EUCU	Schengen	€	OECD	WTO	CA	NATO	ICC	VWP
Slovenia	23,520	1,405	UN	CoE	OSCE	EU	EEA	EUCU	Schengen	€	OECD	WTO	ECS	NATO	ICC	VWP
Spain	31,870	2,056	UN	CoE	OSCE	EU	EEA	EUCU	Schengen	€	OECD	WTO	ESA	NATO	ICC	VWP
Sweden	48,930	2,910	UN	CoE	OSCE	EU	EEA	EUCU	Schengen	SEK	OECD	WTO	ESA	Ratification	ICC	VWP
Switzerland	56,370	6,290	UN	CoE	OSCE		bilat ^{3}		Schengen	CHF	OECD	WTO	ESA	PfP	ICC	VWP
Turkey	8,730	407	UN	CoE	OSCE	suspended		EUCU		TRY	OECD	WTO	CA	NATO		9.0
Ukraine	2,800	287	UN	CoE	OSCE	Candidate			EU visa-free	UAH	GUAM / Applicant	WTO	CA	PfP	sign	30.9
United Kingdom	41,520	2,358	UN	CoE	OSCE					£	OECD	WTO	ESA	NATO	ICC	VWP
Vatican City	n/d		obs	obs	OSCE				Schengen ^{2}	€		obs				7.1

high income ($12,195 or more)
upper middle income ($3,946 - $12,195)
lower middle income ($996 - $3,945)

^{1} These countries are currently not participating in the EU's single market (EEA), but the EU has common external Customs Union agreements with Turkey (EU-Turkey Customs Union in force since 1995), Andorra (since 1991) and San Marino (since 2002). Monaco participates in the EU customs union through its relationship with France; its ports are administered by the French. Vatican City has a customs union in effect with Italy.
^{2} Monaco, San Marino and Vatican City are not members of Schengen, but act as such via their open borders with France and Italy, respectively.
^{3} Switzerland is not an official member of EEA but has bilateral agreements largely with same content, making it virtual member.
