= Republic of Poljica =

Autonomous community in Middle Ages Croatia

The Republic of Poljica or duchy (Croatian: Poljička republika, in older form Poljička knežija) was an autonomous community which existed in the late Middle Ages and the early modern period in central Dalmatia in Southern Europe near modern-day Omiš, Croatia. It was organized as a "peasants' republic" and is best known because of the Poljica Statute (14-15th century).

== Etymology ==
The name poljica stems from the word polje for "field", karst polje in particular, a common geographic feature in the area. The Poljica region was first titled a "republic" by the Venetian writer Alberto Fortis in 1774. It was also known as Poglizza (in Italian).

== Legal system ==
Poljica is best known for the eponymous statute. The oldest preserved revision is from 1440, it refers to an older one from the 14th century, and was further revised in 1475, 1515, 1665, and on several occasions up to the 19th century, growing to 116 articles. It is today kept in Omiš's museum. This document contains a description of the Poljica common law and its system of government, and is one of the most important Croatian historical legal statutes (together with the Vinodol codex of 1288), written in a mixture of Chakavian and Shtokavian dialects, and in Cyrillic (the name appears in the annex of the Statute of Poljica from 1655) (poljičica and poljička azbukvica).

One of the items of the Poljica Statute states that "everyone has the right to live", contrary to many mediaeval European laws replete with capital punishments including torture.

A number of other documents dated from the 12th to 17th century regarding the republic have been preserved, such as Poljički molitvenik (1614) and Statut poljičke bratovštine Sv.Kuzme i Damjana (1619).

== Geography ==
The territories of the Republic of Poljica lay chiefly within the south-easterly curve made by the river Cetina before it enters the Adriatic at Omiš. They also comprised the fastnesses of the Mosor mountain (1,370 m or 4,500 feet) and the fertile strip of coast from Omiš to Stobreč, 16 km (10 mi) W.N.W.

Poljica is divided into three zones: Upper Poljica (Zagorska), behind Mosor, is farthest from the Adriatic Sea and is in the hinterland of Mosor; Middle Poljica (Zavrska), the largest part of Poljica (50%) extends from the Žrnovnica River to the Cetina River at Zadvarje; Lower Poljica (Primorska), built on the remnants of the ancient Greek colony Epetion, which extends along the sea from Omiš to the village of Stobreč.

== History ==
The people of Poljica organized and founded the "parish commune" where they could live according to their own laws. The parish commune was divided into twelve villages (katuni), which they named after twelve larger villages of Poljica:

- (Upper) Gornja Poljica: Srijane, Dolac Donji and Gornje Polje
- (Middle) Sridnja Poljica: Kostanje, Zvečanje, Čišla, Gata, Dubrava, Sitno and Srinjine
- (Lower) Donja Poljica: Duće, Jesenice and Podstrana

Five of the twelve villages were greatly populated by free peasants of Split origin, and are therefore called free peasant composite villages. The other composite villages were populated by descendants of the three brothers (noted to be founders of Poljica). Each of the twelve villages elected an elder, or little duke (knez), to serve as leader. The little dukes of free peasant composite villages did not share the same rights as little dukes of the other villages—they could vote, but not be elected to the government of Poljica due to their ties with Split.

The inhabitants lived in scattered villages, twelve of them, each ruled by its count, and all together ruled by the supreme count. These officers, with the three judges, were always of noble birth, though elected by the whole body of citizens. There were two orders of nobles: but because both noble groups were Croats, and to distinguish them from the original nobles "didići" (the term also existed in the Zadar Archipelago), the later from mid-14th century got nickname "ugričići" after the assumption that they came from the areas under control of Kingdom of Hungary. Didići according to legends are the descendants of three sons of King Miroslav of Croatia (each of them forming a tribe of Tišimiri, Limići and Kremenićani), and were "koljenovići", as they had rights on lands ("didovina"). Vlastela could become the part of "poljički stol", but they needed the confirmation of the assembly of Poljica nobles. The descendants of the office holders were allowed to use titles of duke and count. Below these ranked the commoners and the serfs. At a very early date the warlike highlanders of Poljica became the friends and allies of the Omiš corsairs, who were thus enabled to harass the seaborne trade of their neighbors without fear of a sudden attack by land.

Omiš received a charter from Andrew II of Hungary in 1207, and remained under the nominal protection of Hungary until 1444, when both Omiš and Poljica accepted the suzerainty of Venice, while retaining their internal freedom.

The occupation of Bosnia as well as by the Ottoman Empire gravely impacted the Republic of Poljica. Notable battles were fought by the local forces against the Turks in 1530 and 1686, and in both occasions the Ottoman army was repelled. A local young woman by the name of Mila Gojsalić became a heroine after sacrificing herself for the good of the Poljica community in one of the conflicts with the Turks—she infiltrated the Turkish camp and blew up the munitions stockpile. A statue of Mila Gojsalić by Ivan Meštrović stands in Poljica overlooking the mouth of Cetina, and the story was also made into a theatre play.

After the fall of the Venetian Republic in 1797, Poljica was taken over by Austria. The population of Poljica numbered 6,566 in 1806. In the following year, however, the republic incurred the enmity of Napoleon by rendering aid to the Russians and Montenegrins in Dalmatia, and it was invaded by French troops, who plundered its villages, massacred its inhabitants, and finally deprived it of independence.

After the Napoleonic era, Poljica was absorbed by Austria.

== Legacy ==
Poljica area were also important to Croatian national renaissance on Croatian South, because the votes from Poljica contributed a lot to the victory of the People's Party (Narodna stranka, the Croatian unionist party) in 1882 on the elections in Split county, bringing the pro-Croat forces on ruling level.

It since passed to Yugoslavia, and in 1912, the Poljica region was reconstituted as a single municipality. In 1945, it was split again between several municipalities, and remained that way until the present day, when the villages are part of Croatian municipalities of Omiš, Podstrana, Dugi Rat and Split. Today this area of around 250 km^{2} (97 sq mi) is inhabited by around 20,000 people.

Recently the republic was "re-established" as a cultural organization. The reigning prince (veliki knez) is elected once a year and Petar Rodić was re-elected several times.

== Rulers of the Principality of Poljica ==
The title of the rulers of the Principality of Poljica was župan (count) at first, later changing to knez (prince) and finally veliki knez (grand prince). The early 11-12th century list of rulers is highly doubtful, as the terms "poliscico", "postelnico" and "polstico/i" probably denote Croatian court officier of "postelnik" and not somebody from Poljica, meanwhile others were citizens of Split and are poorly confirmed in historical sources.

Župans (?)

- Dalizio (Dališ) 1070
- Visen (Uisono) 1076, 1078
- Vratina (Uratina) 1088
- Gregor Ivanišević 1120
- Domaso Papalli 1144
- Alberti 1145
- Michiel Francesco Ivancichio 1146
- Comalli Petracca 1148
- Lovretić 1149
- Zuanne/Ivan Papalli 1200-1233

Princes

- Tolen 1239
- The Counts Šubić ruled over Poljica at the end of the 13th century.
- Mladen II Šubić of Bribir 1322
- Gregor Jurinić 1328
- Jure Rajčić between 1342 and 1350
- Dražoe, Lord of Kamengrad 1350

Grand princes in the period 1444–1482

- Grisogono
- Cindro
- Alberti
- Petracca
- Dujam Papalić (Papalli)

Grand princes

- Arnerio Lovretić 1451
- Žane Žanić 1454
- Mijo Pocolić (also known as Kulišić) 1458
- Matija Tusčević Scinsić 1459
- Komula Vitković 1461
- Dujam Papalić 1468
- Stipan Mikulić c. 1469
- Dujam Maričić 1479
- Dujam Papalić 1482 – 1483
- Ivan Petrović October 1499 – March 1500
- Marian Gregolić 1500
- Augustin Maričić 15 February 1503 – January or February 1504
- Ivan Jovanović 1504 – 1511
- Ivaniš Nenada Dražoević 1511 – 1546
- Ivan Augustinović (Dražoević) veliki knez five times in the period 1512 – 1537
- Jure Pavić March 1537
- Radoš Sladoević 1541
- Ivan Augustinović (Dražoević) 1546 – 1567
- Augustin Maričić 1555
- Nikola Sudgić 1567 – 1581
- Stipan Mikulić (Nikolić, Dražoević) 1581 – 1605
- Pavo Pavić 1596
- Jure Pavić 1607 – 1609
- Radoš Sudgić 1609 – 1626
- Nikola Gojaković 1619
- Ivan Sikić 1620
- Jure Sinovčić 1626 – 1628
- Pavo Sudgić 1628 – 1632
- Jure Pavić 1632 – 1655
- Stipan Bobetić 8 March 1652
- Jure Sinovčić 1655 – 1676
- Pavo Sučić 1676 – 1678
- Ivaniš Novaković 1678 – 1684
- Luka Sinovčić 1684 – 1701
- Marko Barić 1701 – 1704
- Marko Sinovčić 1704 – 1708
- Ivan Sinovčić 14 September 1706
- Jure Novaković 24 November 1707
- Marko Barić 1708 – 1710
- Ivan Barić 1710 – 1712
- Petar Barić 11 August 1711
- Marko Barić 1712 – 1716
- Ivan Sinovčić 1716 – 1717
- Ivan Barić 1717 – 1721
- Ivan Novaković 1721 – 1732
- Pavo Pavić 28 October 1728
- Petar Sinovčić 1732 – 1740
- Marko Barić 1740 – 1742
- Ivan Novaković 1742 – 1747
- Marko Barić 1747 – 1760
- Ivan Pavić 20 July 1756
- Jure Novaković 1760 – 1768
- Frano Pavić 1766 – 1768
- Ivan Jerončić 1768 – 1771
- Frano Pavić 1770 – 1777
- Ivan Jerončić 1777 – 1778
- Andrija Barić 1778 – 1783
- Jure Novaković 1783 – 1789
- Ivan Sičić 1789
- Matija Kružičević 1793
- Frano Pavić 9 September 1796
- Frano Gojselić 24 February 1796

Grand princes during the period of the Austrian occupation of Dalmatia

- Marko Žuljević 18 November 1797 – 25 March 1798
- Matija Mianović 21 May 1799 – 1 December 1801
- Ivan Čović 23 April 1803 – 1806

Grand princes during the period of the French occupation of Dalmatia

- Ivan Čović until 10 June 1807, when the Principality of Poljica was abolished by the French.
