= Podgrađe, Split-Dalmatia County =

Settlement in Split-Dalmatia County, Croatia

Podgrađe
- Settlement
- Interactive map of Podgrađe
- Location of Podgrađe in Croatia
- Coordinates: 43°26′17″N 16°51′38″E
- Country: Croatia
- County: Split-Dalmatia
- City: Omiš

Area
  - Total: 7.8 km^{2} (3.0 sq mi)

Population (2021)
  - Total: 289
  - Density: 37/km^{2} (96/sq mi)
- Time zone: UTC+1 (CET)
  - Summer (DST): UTC+2 (CEST)
- Postal code: 21310 Omiš

Podgrađe is a settlement in the City of Omiš in Croatia. In 2021, its population was 289.

== Demographics ==
Podgrađe: Population trends 1857–2021
v

population	338	326	316	377	409	458	411	507	504	519	507	479	409	332	312	280	289
	1857	1869	1880	1890	1900	1910	1921	1931	1948	1953	1961	1971	1981	1991	2001	2011	2021

Sources: Croatian Bureau of Statistics publications
