= List of sovereign states in Europe by GDP (PPP) =

This is a list of European nations sorted by their gross domestic product (GDP), the value of all final goods and services produced within a nation in a given year. The GDP dollar estimates presented here are derived from purchasing power parity (PPP) calculations for the latest years recorded in The World Factbook. The list includes all members of the Council of Europe, Belarus and Kosovo. The figures provided are all quoted in United States dollar.

== Gross domestic product ==
=== GDP (PPP) by country in 2026 (in billions of USD) ===

less than 100 between 100 and 450 between 450 and 1000 over 1000	Supranational political and economic union Partially recognised state Dependent territory

Rank	Country	Year	GDP (PPP) billions of USD	Year | Country	GDP (PPP) billions of USD
-	European Union	2026 est.	$30,677.594	2017 est.	$19,172.84
1	Russian Federation	2026 est.	$7,525.159	2017 est.	$3,807.10
2	(European Union) Germany	2026 est.	$6,408.420	2017 est.	$4,475.28
3	(European Union) France	2026 est.	$4,734.241	2017 est.	$2,975.79
4	United Kingdom	2026 est.	$4,720.863	2017 est.	$3,063.42
5	Turkey	2026 est.	$4,025.249	2017 est.	$2,277.15
6	(European Union) Italy	2026 est.	$3,871.906	2017 est.	$2,528.64
7	(European Union) Spain	2026 est.	$2,977.960	2017 est.	$1,854.71
8	(European Union) Poland	2026 est.	$2,164.271	2017 est.	$1,145.71
9	(European Union) Netherlands	2026 est.	$1,592.206	2017 est.	$960.00
10	Kazakhstan	2026 est.	$993.672	2017 est.	$447.14
11	Switzerland	2026 est.	$960.599	2017 est.	$586.06
12	(European Union) Romania	2026 est.	$950.384	2017 est.	$527.79
13	(European Union) Belgium	2026 est.	$937.719	2017 est.	$571.67
14	(European Union) Ireland	2026 est.	$884.699	2017 est.	$388.17
15	(European Union) Sweden	2026 est.	$829.539	2017 est.	$516.83
16	Ukraine	2026 est.	$724.527	2017 est.	$496.52
17	(European Union) Austria	2026 est.	$721.033	2017 est.	$473.92
18	(European Union) Czech Republic	2026 est.	$690.823	2017 est.	$416.85
19	Norway	2026 est.	$654.160	2017 est.	$352.65
20	(European Union) Portugal	2026 est.	$567.632	2017 est.	$339.61
21	(European Union) Denmark	2026 est.	$541.335	2017 est.	$318.64
22	(European Union) Greece	2026 est.	$488.577	2017 est.	$308.46
23	(European Union) Hungary	2026 est.	$482.256	2017 est.	$289.16
24	(European Union) Finland	2026 est.	$386.703	2017 est.	$260.18
25	Belarus	2026 est.	$322.020	2017 est.	$174.18
26	(European Union) Bulgaria	2026 est.	$283.481	2017 est.	$151.84
27	Azerbaijan	2026 est.	$281.296	2017 est.	$141.07
28	(European Union) Slovak Republic	2026 est.	$267.420	2017 est.	$164.51
29	Serbia	2026 est.	$226.376	2017 est.	$121.36
30	(European Union) Croatia	2026 est.	$211.016	2017 est.	$112.71
31	(European Union) Lithuania	2026 est.	$176.929	2017 est.	$95.50
32	(European Union) Slovenia	2026 est.	$129.498	2017 est.	$74.76
33	Georgia	2026 est.	$125.448	2017 est.	$51.14
34	(European Union) Luxembourg	2026 est.	$109.016	2017 est.	$68.57
35	(European Union) Latvia	2026 est.	$85.118	2017 est.	$53.70
36	Bosnia and Herzegovina	2026 est.	$82.892	2017 est.	$46.72
37	Armenia	2026 est.	$82.743	2017 est.	$35.95
38	(European Union) Estonia	2026 est.	$70.711	2017 est.	$45.46
39	(European Union) Cyprus	2026 est.	$67.441	2017 est.	$33.02
40	Albania	2026 est.	$67.366	2017 est.	$36.70
41	North Macedonia	2026 est.	$57.315	2017 est.	$32.58
42	Moldova	2026 est.	$49.537	2017 est.	$31.00
43	(European Union) Malta	2026 est.	$47.260	2017 est.	$21.38
44	Kosovo	2026 est.	$34.200	2017 est.	$18.69
45	Iceland	2026 est.	$32.928	2017 est.	$19.36
46	Montenegro	2026 est.	$22.689	2017 est.	$12.12
47	Liechtenstein	2026 est.	$8.133	2017 est.	$5.29
48	Andorra	2026 est.	$6.932	2017 est.	$3.92
49	San Marino	2026 est.	$3.001	2017 est.	$1.78
	Total		$51,684.699	Total	$30,934.735

== See also ==
- List of European countries by GNI (nominal) per capita
- Economy of Europe
- European Union
