= Defence industry of Pakistan =

The Defence Industry of Pakistan (Urdu: دفاعی صنعتِ پاکستان), established in September 1951, mainly falls under the purview of the Ministry of Defence Production. It aims to foster collaboration and oversee the diverse range of military production facilities that have emerged since Pakistan's independence. The MoDP comprises specialized organizations, each dedicated to various aspects of the defence industry, including research and development, production, and administration.

== History ==
In 1947, Pakistan inherited virtually no military industry or production capability. Its heavy industry was limited to the Karachi Shipyard and Engineering Works (KSEW), mainly focused on civilian maritime construction. To meet its defense needs, the newly formed nation relied solely on inherited equipment or imports, primarily from the United Kingdom.

Recognizing the need for self-reliance, Prime Minister Liaquat Ali Khan established the Pakistan Ordnance Factory (POF) in Wah in 1951. Led by Dr. Abdul Hafeez, a distinguished scientist, the POF initially focused on producing small arms, ammunition, and chemical explosives.

However, from 1955 to 1964, Pakistan heavily relied on the United States for military equipment due to its membership in SEATO and CENTO. This period saw minimal development of the domestic arms industry.

=== Turning Point and Expansion (1965-1972) ===
The Indo-Pakistani War of 1965 and the subsequent cutoff of U.S. military assistance marked a turning point. Realizing the vulnerability of relying solely on external sources, Pakistan sought help from China to expand its military capabilities. China played a crucial role in modernizing the POF facilities and fostering domestic production.

=== Self-Reliance and Growth (1972-Present) ===
In 1972, the aftermath of the 1971 war further emphasized the need for self-reliance. The government established the Ministry of Defence Production (MoDP) to coordinate and promote a growing network of military production facilities established since independence.

PAC played a key role in propelling domestic aircraft production. It reverse-engineered various aircraft technologies, built the Mushshak trainer, and maintained vital radar and avionics equipment. This success paved the way for further advancements, including the Super Mushshak and the Karakoram-8 advanced training jet.

By 1999, the Karachi Shipyard & Engineering Works (KSEW) completed its first long-range attack submarine, the Agosta 90B. This submarine marked a significant advancement, incorporating air-independent propulsion (AIP) technology acquired from France in 1995. Early 2000 saw further progress through joint ventures with China. These collaborations led to the introduction of the JF-17 fighter jet, developed by the Pakistan Aeronautical Complex (PAC), and the Al-Khalid main battle tank, produced at Heavy Industries Taxila (HIT). Since 2001, Pakistan has made significant strides towards self-sufficiency in aircraft overhaul and modernization, as well as in the export of defence equipment.

In 2016, the Pakistani government managed to reduce its defence imports by 90%. Today, the MoDP oversees a vast network dedicated to research, development, production and administration, solidifying Pakistan's position as a significant regional military force.

=== Youm-e-Takbir ===
Youm-e-Takbir (Urdu: یومِ تکبیر, lit. "The Day of Greatness") is a national day celebrated in Pakistan on May 28 each year. It commemorates the Chagai-I and Chagai-II nuclear tests conducted by Pakistan in 1998. These tests made Pakistan the seventh country to possess nuclear weapons and the first Islamic-majority nation to do so.

=== Local Gunsmiths ===
Pakistan's Khyber Pakhtunkhwa province, particularly the Dara Adam Khel area bordering Afghanistan, is known for a unique cottage industry: the manufacturing of unlicensed firearms by local gunsmiths. This industry boasts a long history, dating back to the mid-19th century, and has garnered a global reputation for its ability to produce replicas of sophisticated weaponry. Dara Adam Khel's story begins in 1857 with the establishment of a small gun-making factory by a British soldier. This act laid the foundation for what would become a thriving black market for firearms. Historical records indicate that by 2014, the area housed a staggering 7,500 gun-manufacturing workshops, all catering to a booming demand. Located just 49 kilometers south of Peshawar, the provincial capital, Dara Adam Khel's weapons market has become synonymous with handmade replicas of deadly weapons. From the iconic AK-47 to anti-aircraft guns, the industry prides itself on its ability to create affordable replicas of virtually any firearm in the world. These replicas, known as "Khyber Pass copies" are a testament to the skill of local gunsmiths. The cottage gunsmiths of Dara Adam Khel operate with resourcefulness. They employ basic hand tools and readily available materials such as scrap metal from railways and vehicles. The quality of these Khyber Pass copies varies significantly. While some may be comparable to factory-produced firearms, others can be dangerously unreliable and prone to malfunction.

== Domestic suppliers ==
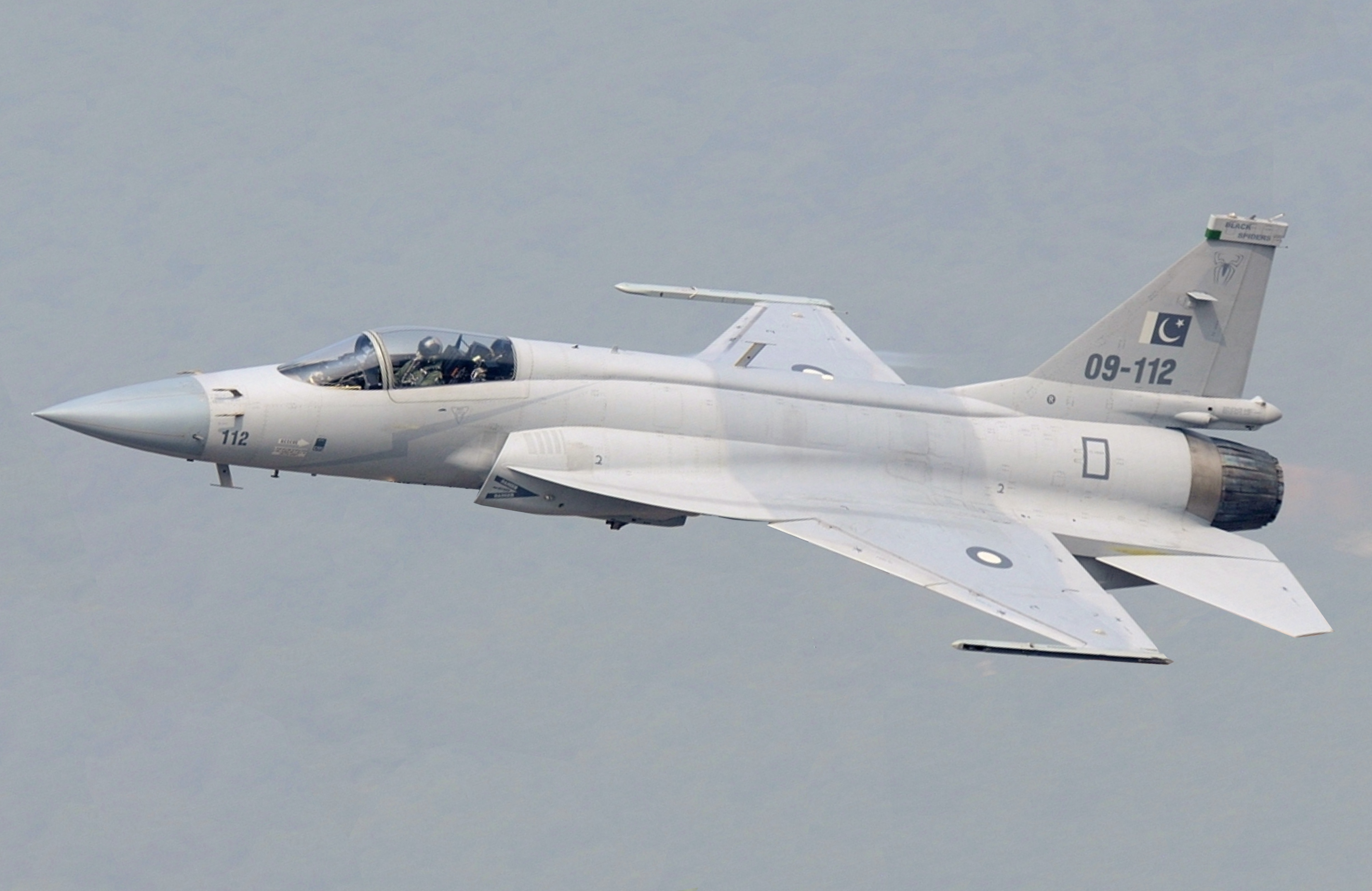
A CAC/PAC JF-17 Thunder of the Pakistan Air Force.

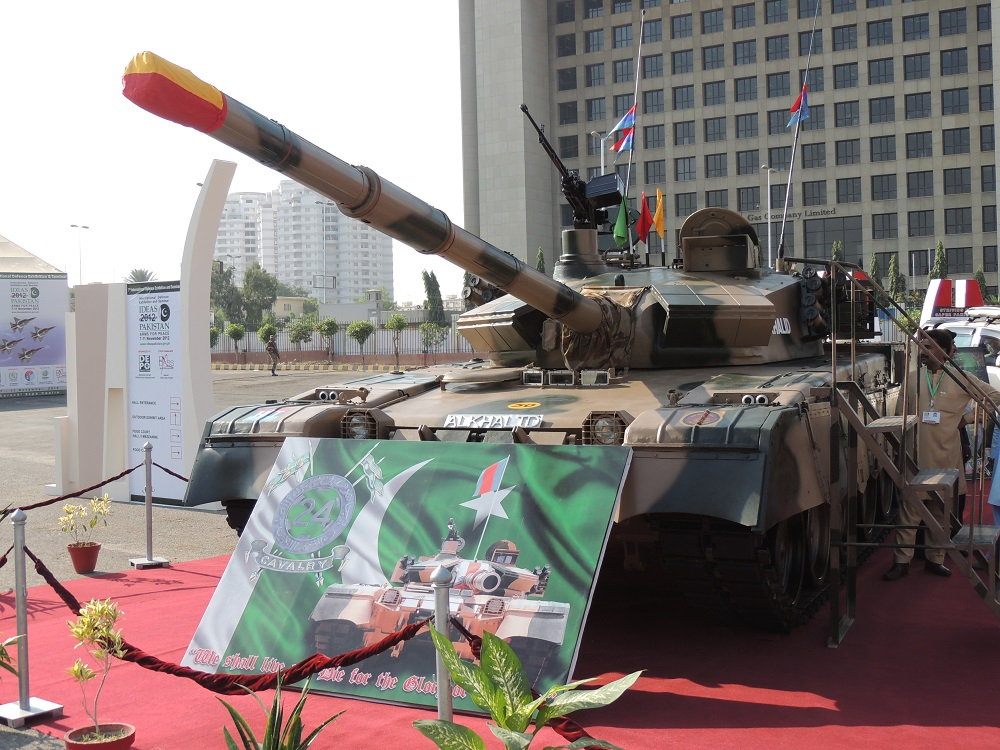
HIT built Al-Khalid tank on display.

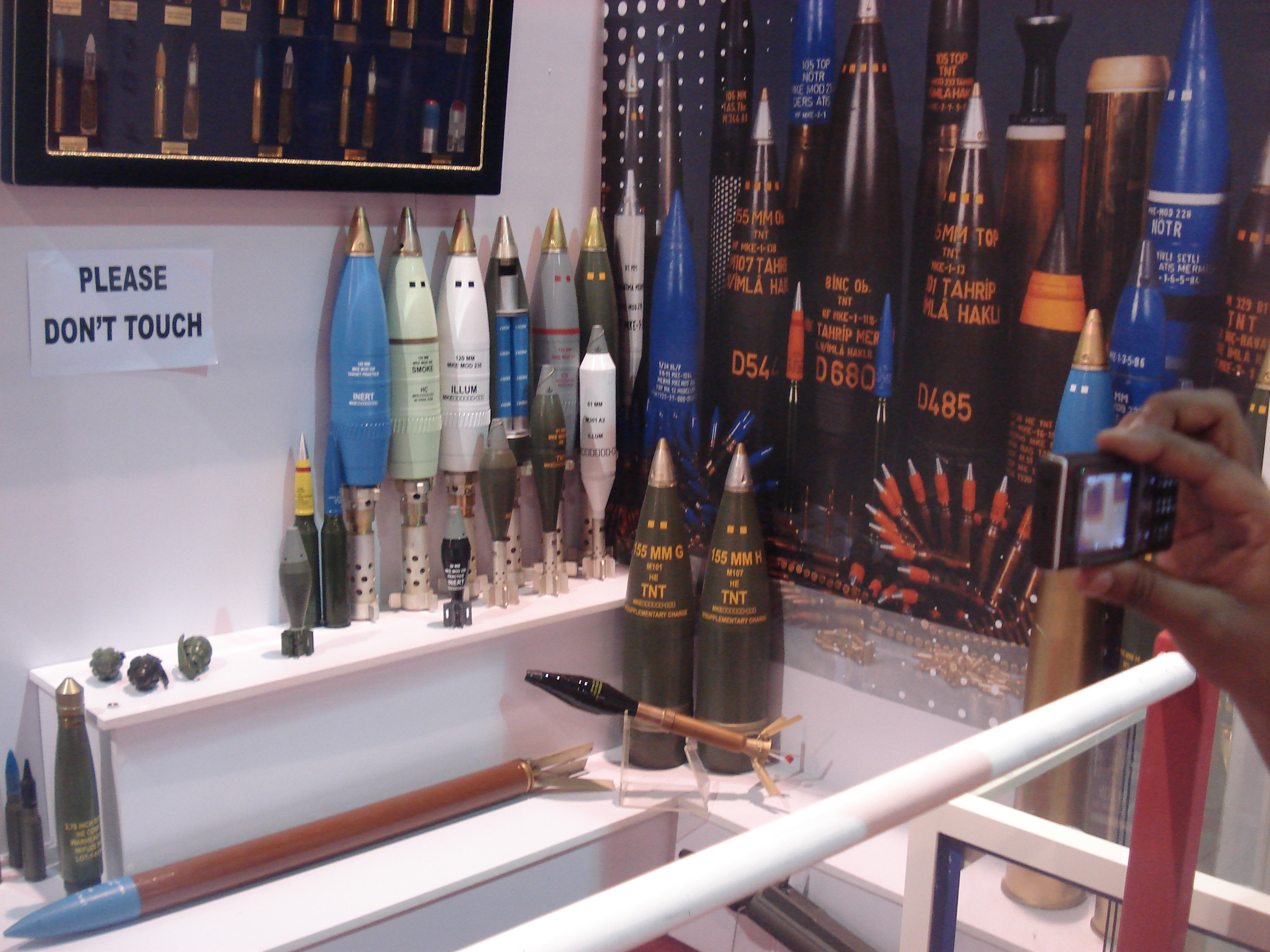
A variety of grenades, artillery shells, mortar shells and other ammunition produced by POF.

=== State-owned companies ===
Company	References
Global Industrial & Defence Solutions	
Al-Technique Corporation of Pakistan Limited	
Air Weapons Complex	
National Engineering & Scientific Commission	
National Defence Complex	
Maritime Technologies Complex	
Project Management Organization	
Defence Science and Technology Organization	
National Electronics Complex of Pakistan	
Khan Research Laboratories	
National Radio & Telecommunication Corporation	
Telephone Industries of Pakistan	
Karachi Shipyard & Engineering Works	
Pakistan Aeronautical Complex	
Kamra Aviation Industries Limited	
Pakistan Ordnance Factories	
Wah Industries Limited	
Wah Nobel Limited	
POF Metallurgical Laboratory	
Heavy Industries Taxila	
Margalla Heavy Industries Limited	
People Steel Mills Ltd	
Research & Development Establishment	
Navy Research and Development Institute	
Precision Engineering Complex	
Pakistan Machine Tool Factory	
Pakistan Hunting & Sporting Arms Development Company	
Heavy Mechanical Complex	
Karachi Naval Dockyard	
National Aerospace Science & Technology Park	

=== Private companies ===
Company	References
Integrated Dynamics	
Advanced Systems (Pvt) Limited	
Daudsons Armoury	
Rapidev Group	
ACES Pvt Limited	
Laser & Electro Optical Solutions	
SATUMA Pvt Limited	
Cavalier Group	
Zeeshan Electronics	
Stingray Technologies	
DynTek Engineering	
AKSA Solutions Development Services (Pvt) Limited	
Alsons Industries (Pvt) Limited	
Bismillah Electronics	
Haseen Habib Corporation	
International Polymer Industries (Pvt) Limited	
Machine Craft (Pvt) Limited	
Metal Engineering Works (Pvt) Limited	
Genesis Solutions (Pvt) Limited	
NexTek Service	
Soft Innovative Systems	
Multisupport Engineering & Consultancy Service	
Sysverve Aerospace	
Harobanx Industries	
Future Innovative Enterprise Pvt. Limited	
Teresol Pvt Limited	
Steelex (Pvt) Limited	
Micro Electronics International (Pvt) Limited	
Meraj (Pvt) Limited	
Fast Cables Limited	
Elektro Control Industries	
CARE Pvt Limited	
And-Or Logic Pakistan (Pvt) Limited	

== Foreign suppliers ==
The Pakistan Armed Forces utilize a blend of domestically produced and internationally procured military equipment. As per the 2021 Stockholm International Peace Research Institute (SIPRI) report, Pakistan ranked 10th globally in terms of arms imports for the 2016-2020 period. During this timeframe, the People's Republic of China constituted the primary source of imported weaponry, accounting for 74% of Pakistan's total imports. The Russian Federation and the Italian Republic followed suit, contributing 6.6% and 5.9%, respectively. Notably, the 2016-2020 period witnessed a 23% decrease in Pakistan's foreign arms imports compared to the preceding five-year period (2011-2015).

- Brazil
- Canada
- China
- Czech Republic
- Egypt
- France
- Germany
- South Korea
- Italy
- Japan
- Jordan
- Russia
- Serbia
- Slovakia
- Spain
- Sweden
- Switzerland
- Turkey
- Ukraine
- United Kingdom
- United States

== Exports ==
Pakistan's defense industry has emerged as a notable exporter of military equipment in recent decades. Its offerings encompass a diverse range of products, including small arms and ammunition, armored vehicles like the Al-Khalid tank and the JF-17 Thunder fighter jet co-developed with China. Pakistan's ability to offer these products at competitive prices compared to Western alternatives has been a key driver of its success in the international market. This, coupled with close defense ties with countries in the Middle East and growing partnerships with nations like China and Turkey, has facilitated exports to regions like the Middle East, Africa and South Asia.

However, Pakistan's defense exports also face challenges. Established players like the US, Russia, and European nations pose significant competition, and concerns have been raised about the level of technological sophistication in certain Pakistani defense products. Additionally, regional tensions and international arms control regulations can sometimes hinder export deals.

Despite these challenges, Pakistan is actively working to expand its defense exports. The country aims to achieve this by focusing on several key areas: enhancing the technological sophistication of its products, exploring new markets in Southeast Asia and beyond, and forging strategic partnerships to bolster its production capabilities. Events like the International Defence Exhibition and Seminar (IDEAS) further contributes to these efforts by showcasing Pakistani defense products and fostering interactions with potential buyers. Overall, Pakistan's defense industry exports represent a significant and evolving aspect of the country's economy and strategic landscape.

== Exhibition ==
The International Defence Exhibition and Seminar (IDEAS) is a biennial defence exhibition and seminar organized by the Defence Export Promotion Organization (DEPO) since 2002 in Karachi Expo Center.

== See also ==
- List of military equipment manufactured in Pakistan
- International Defence Exhibition and Seminar
