= Institute of Optronics =

Defunct military research institute

- Industry: Defense; Optronics
- Founded: 1984
- Fate: Merged into Research and Development Establishment (RDE)
- Successor: Research and Development Establishment (RDE)
- Headquarters: Rawalpindi, Punjab, Pakistan
- Area served: Worldwide
- Key people: Akram S. Hussain Abidi
- Products: Night vision devices (NVD); Thermal weapon sights

The Institute of Optronics (shortened as IOP) was a military funded research and development institute located in Rawalpindi, Punjab, Pakistan.

Established in 1984 by the Ministry of Defence (MoD), the Institute of Optronics (IOP) conducted research on military lasers, optoelectronics and photonics to support the capabilities of the Pakistan Armed Forces.

After a reorganization within the Ministry of Defence Production in 2020, the IOP was merged into the newly formed Research and Development Establishment.

== Overview ==
In 1984, the Ministry of Defence established the Institute of Optronics (IOP) as a research and development (R&D) institute focused on military applications of lasers, optoelectronics, photonics and optronics. Set up under military control, the institute's first director was Lieutenant-General Talat Masood from DESTO, located in Rawalpindi Cantonment. The scientific investigations on photonics was led by its principal investigator, Akram S. Hussain Abidi, a physicist with optics specialization who once worked for the NASA at their Goddard Space Flight Center.

Under Abidi's leadership, the institute acquired expertise in night vision technology through reverse engineering of American models. During the period 1985–1989, the IOP successfully developed and manufactured its first night vision devices (NVDs) based on the AN/PVS-4, AN/PVS-5 and AN/PVS-7 models.

== Products ==
- Single Tube Night Vision Binocular
- Aviator's Night Vision Goggle For Helicopter
- Thermal Imaging (TI) Based APC Commander & Driver Sights
- Short & Medium Range Thermal Weapon Sight
- Night Vision Weapon Sight For LMG

== See also ==
- Night vision device
- AN/PVS-4
- AN/PVS-14
- IDEAS
