= Arms deal =

Arms deal may refer to:

- Arms trafficking
- Al-Yamamah arms deal
- Bofors scandal
- Egyptian-Czech arms deal
- South African Arms Deal
- 2017 United States-Saudi Arabia arms deal

== See also ==
- Arms industry
