= Ministry of Defence Production (Pakistan) =

Government ministry of Pakistan

Agency overview
- Formed: 2 September 2004; 21 years ago
- Preceding agency: Defense Production Division
- Jurisdiction: Government of Pakistan
- Headquarters: Pakistan Secretariat-II in Rawalpindi, Punjab
- Minister responsible: Raza Hayat Hiraj, Minister of Defence Production
- Agency executive: Lt-General (R) Chiragh Haider Baloch, Secretary of Defence Production
- Website: www.modp.gov.pk

The Ministry of Defence Production (Urdu: وزارت دفاعی پيداوار; Trans.: Wazarat-e-Defai Padawar) abbreviated as MoDP, is an executive ministry of the federal Government of Pakistan with objectives of development and production of ordnance and machinery for the Pakistan Armed Forces.

Established as a separate ministry from its parent agency, Ministry of Defence in 2004, the MoDP oversees the development of conventional military weapons system through its separately funded organizations.

== Organizational structure ==
The Ministry of Defence Production is headed by Minister of Defence Production who is an elected member of parliament. The minister of defense production is assisted by the secretary of defense production—a usually a military officer. The MoDP is located in the vicinity of Ministry of Defense in Rawalpindi.

The ministry's bureaucracy is split into three wings, administration, projects, and foreign collaboration, each overseen by an assistant secretary.

== History ==
The Ministry of Defence (MoD) established the "Directorate for General Supply and Development (DG&D) in 1947; it was reorganized as "Defense Purchase Directorate" in 1953.

After the war with India in 1965, the MoD took initiatives to increase domestic production of ordnance for the Pakistani military, and the "Defence Production Division" was established in 1972. Between 1970s–80, the assistance provided by China, France and Sweden, the MoD was able to established the Heavy Industries Taxila (HIT) for army, Pakistan Aeronautical Complex (PAC) for the air force, and expanded the work scope of the Karachi Shipyard & Engineering Works for the navy.

In a view of export control of weapon designs and ammunition's production in 2004, the Division was separated from the MoD and was established as "Ministry of Defence Production."

== Development agencies ==
The Ministry of Defence Productions owns and sponsors five major organizations that includes Heavy Industries Taxila (HIT), Karachi Shipyard & Engineering Works (KSEW), Pakistan Aeronautical Complex (PAC), Pakistan Ordnance Factories (POF), and National Radio and Telecommunication Corporation (NRTC); though the corporate leadership is provided by the Pakistani military.

The Research and Development Establishment (RDE) is a research and development (R&D) administration within the MoDP created in 2020 after merging three research installations – the Institute of Optronics (IOP), Armament Research and Development Establishment (ARDE) and Military Vehicles Research and Development Establishment (MVRDE) dedicated for weapons development for the military.

In addition, there are three other major agencies that oversees the national security related technological development and export control of its designs and products within MoDP, including the Defence Export Promotion Organization (DEPO), the Directorate-General Munition Production, and the Directorate-General Defence Purchase.

== Sponsorships ==
The MoDP is the official sponsor of International Defence Exhibition and Seminar (IDEAS) through its agency, the Defence Export Promotion Organization, since 2002. The IDEAS conference is held in Karachi Expo Centre biennially.

== List of ministers of Defence Production ==
No.	Federal ministers	Term		Political party	Prime Minister
No.	Federal ministers	Took office	Left office	Political party	Prime Minister
1.	Maj. Habibullah Warraich	2 September 2004	15 November 2007	PML-Q	Shaukat Aziz
-	Salim Abbas Jilani (Caretaker)	17 November 2007	30 March 2008	Independent	Mohammad Soomro'
2.	Tanveer Hussain	31 March 2008	13 May 2008	PML N	Yousaf Raza Gillani
3.	A.Q. Khan Jatoi	3 November 2008	3 October 2010	PPP	Yousaf Raza Gillani
4.	Makhdoom Shahabuddin	14 December 2010	11 February 2011	PPP	Yousaf Raza Gillani
5.	Pervaiz Elahi	3 May 2011	19 June 2012	PML-Q	Yousaf Raza Gillani
5.	Pervaiz Elahi	22 June 2012	24 June 2012	PML-Q	Pervaiz Ashraf
6.	Bahadur Khan	26 June 2012	16 March 2013	PPP	Pervaiz Ashraf
7.	Tanveer Hussain	8 June 2013	3 May 2018	PML N	Nawaz Sharif
8.	Usman Ibrahim	4 May 2018	31 May 2018	PML N	Nawaz Sharif
-	Naeem Khalid Lodhi (Caretaker)	27 June 2018	16 August 2018	Caretaker	Nasirul Mulk
9.	Zubaida Jalal	20 August 2018	10 April 2022	Balochistan Awami Party	Imran Khan
10.	Israr Tareen	April 2022	10 August 2023	Balochistan Awami Party	Shehbaz Sharif
11.	Anwar Ali Haider	17 August 2023	till date	Caretaker	Anwarul Haq Kakar

== See also ==
- Defence industry of Pakistan
- List of military equipment manufactured in Pakistan
- List of missiles of Pakistan
- Ministry of Maritime Affairs (Pakistan)
