= Directorate General Munition Production =

Govt department under Ministry of Defence Production (Pakistan)

- Type: Government Department
- Purpose: Defense Production
- Location: Pakistan
- Leader: Major General (R) Obaid Bin Zakria
- Parent organization: Ministry of Defence Production
- Website: http://www.dgmp.gov.pk/

The Directorate General of Munitions Production (DGMP) is a department under the Ministry of Defense Production in Pakistan. It plays an important role in the country's defense procurement and production.

== Achievements ==
=== Indigenous development of anti-ship cruise missiles ===
Under the leadership of Major General (retd) Ubaid bin Zakaria, DGMP has made significant progress in defense technology. A notable achievement is the successful test launch of the indigenously developed anti-ship cruise missile Harba. This missile has both anti-ship and land attack roles.

=== Global arms market ===
Pakistan is making arrangements to target the global arms market through DGMP efforts. The country is focusing on reasserting its presence in the global arms and ammunition market. Global Industrial and Defence Solutions (GIDS) is one of the key players in the initiative.

== Autonomy ==
In February 2020, the federal government has decided to declare five institutions, including the DGMP of the Ministry of Defense Production, as autonomous institutions.

== Controversies ==
In October 2022, the Auditor General of Pakistan (AGP) discovered significant discrepancies. The DGMP and other departments were implicated in these irregularities, which amounted to Rs 21.4 billion and US$ 243 million. These departments failed to provide documents that could be audited due to reported discrepancies. These discrepancies were attributed to the unauthorized disbursement of special allowances at revised rates rather than at the frozen level, leading to a loss of Rs.93.40 million.
