= AN/PVS-4 =

Military passive night vision scope

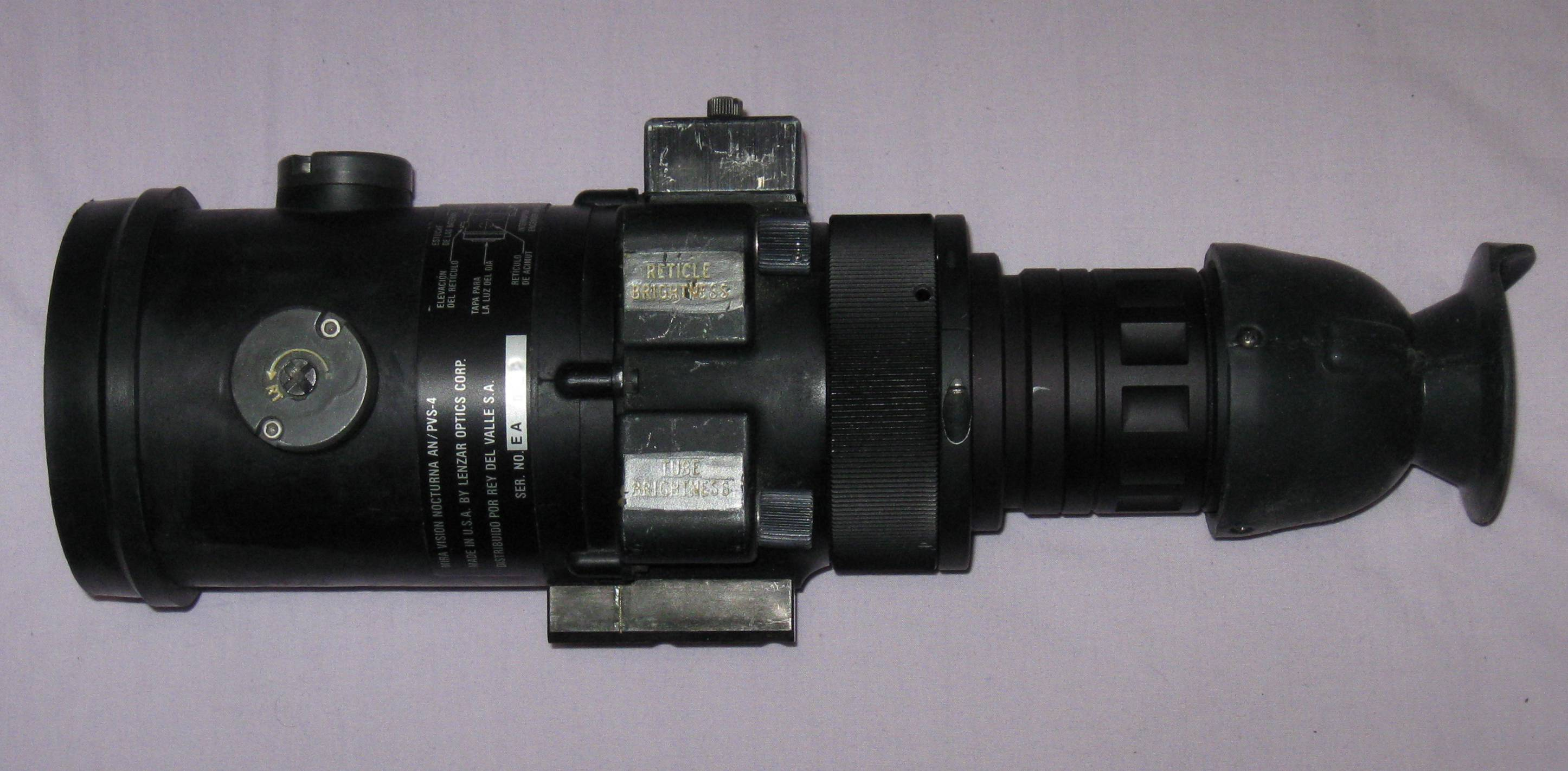
- "PVS-4 Starlight Scope"
- Type: Passive
- Place of origin: United States
- Category: Night Vision Device

Service history
- In service: 1978–present
- Used by: United States
- Wars: Persian Gulf War

Production history
- Designer: Optic Electronic Corporation of Dallas
- Designed: 1975
- Manufacturer: Optic Electronic Corporation of Dallas
- Produced: 1977–2002
- No. built: > 150,000
- Variants: AN/TVS-5, NVS-700, NVS-800

Specifications
- Weight: 4.0 lb (1800 g)
- Dimensions (L×H×W): 320mm (l) x 120mm (h) x 100mm (w)
- Resolution (lp/mm): 32 lp/mm
- Mode of Operation: Passive
- II tube: MX9644
- Field of vision (°): 14.5 degrees
- Range of detection: 600m (Starlight)
- Range of recognition: 400m (Starlight)
- System zoom: 3.6x
- Generation: 2
- Can use these tubes: ITT FX9860, ITT F4845 (civilian Gen3+1); ITT F4844 Gen3+1; ITT F4849 Gen3 FO+twist; ITT F9860 Gen3 FO+twist; Northrop Grumman MX-9644; MX9644/UV Gen2; MX9644/UV Gen3+1; Northrop-Grumman Gen3 MX-11619; Northrop-Grumman Gen3 MX-11620; Newcon Optik NC107663I; Alpha Optics AC-22525R; Noga Light Type 6014; DEP-Photonis XX-2050; DEP-Photonis XX-2052Q; HiOptic 1XZ25/25W; HiOptic XX-1470; Ei-SOVA XX-2500; Harder Digital HD1400; Harder Digital HD1450

AN/PVS-4 (Night Vision Sight, Individual Served Weapon, AN/PVS-4) is the U.S. military designation for a specification of the first second generation passive Night vision device. The AN/PVS-4 first saw widespread use during the Gulf War and later some deployment in the Iraq War and has since been replaced by modern third-generation weapon sights.

In accordance with the Joint Electronics Type Designation System (JETDS), the "AN/PVS-4" designation represents the 4th design of an Army-Navy electronic device for portable visual detection equipment. The JETDS system also now is used to name all Department of Defense electronic systems.

== Introduction ==
Although passive night vision technology capable of allowing vision under ambient starlight conditions has existed since the 1950s, it was not until the AN/PVS-4 was developed that a practical, high quality device that met military requirements was first made available.

Unlike earlier passive starlight weapon scopes the AN/PVS-4 provided a high quality image without significant distortion, could adjust to changing ambient light conditions, was able to take multiple reticles to operate in many roles and had protective features allowing it to shut down in the event of exposure to bright light, but still recover in time after a muzzle flash for the operator to see the round hit the target.

Using the MX-9644 Image Intensifier tube the AN/PVS-4 became one of the most widely used night vision scopes and has been in active use for more than a quarter of a century.

== History ==
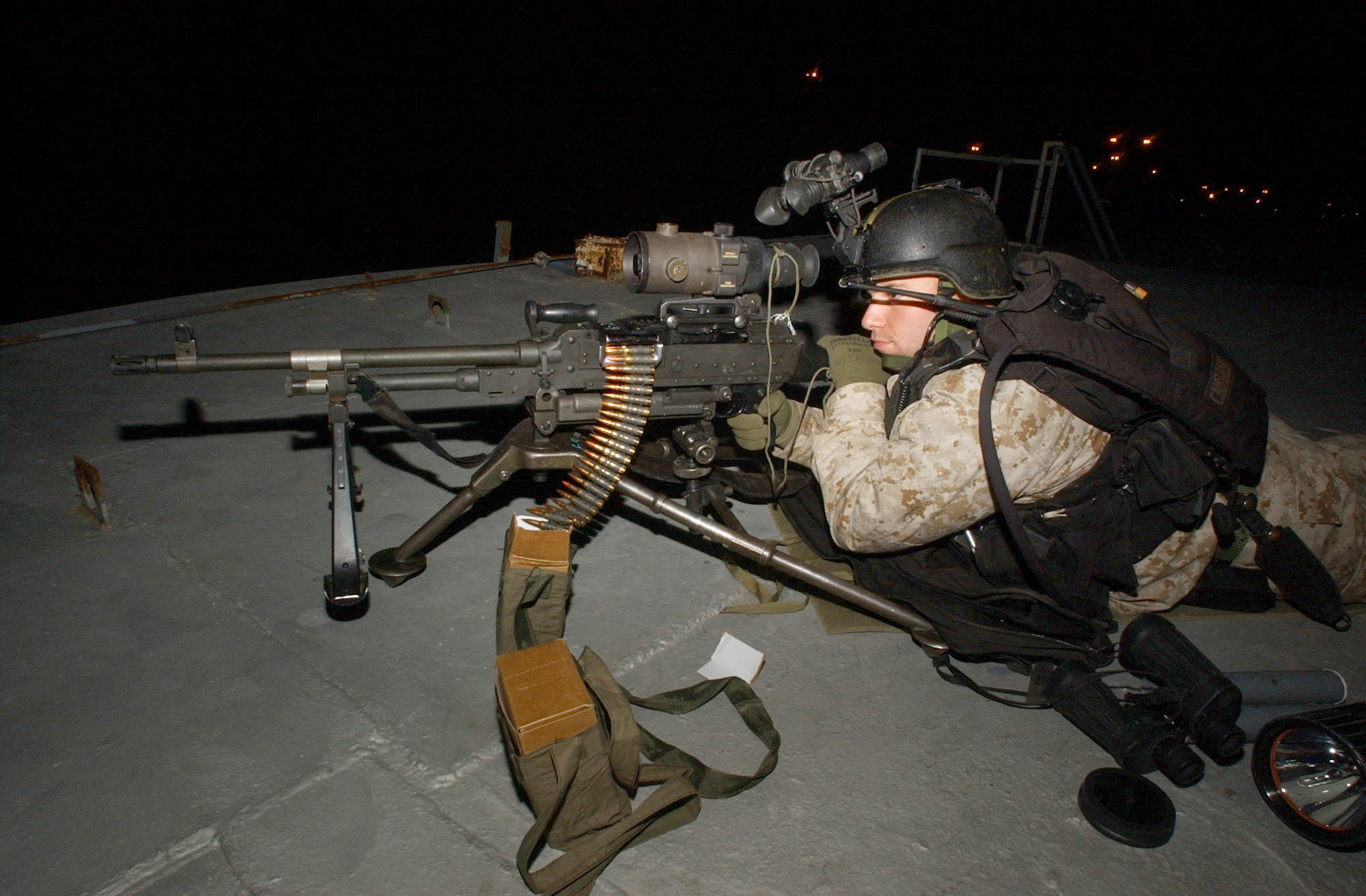
US Marine with a M240G machine gun in the Persian Gulf, 2004.

Initial engineering development of the AN/PVS-4 was undertaken by Optic Electronic Corporation of Dallas, Texas, in 1975 as a replacement for the Vietnam War era AN/PVS-2 Starlight Scope.

In 1976, the first production contract was awarded for 47,074 units, and first deployed in 1978.

16,927 more units were produced between 1985 and 1989 and 24,046 more units produced between 1990 and 1992.

By 2002, more than 150,000 units had been produced within the United States alone.

Although production has ceased, as recently as 2008 the US military was still obtaining parts to both repair AN/PVS-4s and convert AN/PVS-4s to AN/TVS-5As. It is still presently also upgrading AN/PVS-4s to AN/PVS4As also.

During the Gulf War, the AN/PVS-4 was widely deployed on a variety of weapons. The Gulf War represented the first war in which ground combat operations continued both day and night through the use of night vision devices.

Although more modern equipment was available during the Iraq War, the AN/PVS-4 was still in active use. Production of the AN/PAS-13 thermal weapon sight began in 1996 and production of the AN/PVS-4 ceased entirely by 2002.

== Design details ==
The AN/PVS-4 uses a 25mm screw-type variable-gain Image Intensifier tube. Operational voltage is 3.0 Volts. Early production models feature two circular battery compartments located on the main housing. These battery compartments are designed to accommodate one 3.0V BA-5567/U, or two 1.5V BA-3058/U simultaneously. Later designations such as the AN/PVS-4A use two common AA batteries (BA-3058/U) via a purpose-built adapter (PN A3009873) that attaches to one of the circular battery compartments. Use of the adapter negates the need for BA-5567/U and BA-3058/U. AN/PVS-4s still in use today are typically upgraded with the AA battery adapter even if they have not been upgraded to a third generation tube. Some AN/PVS-4A models made after 1984 feature an integral AA battery housing that does not require the use of an external AA battery adapter.

=== MX-9644 Image Intensifier Tube ===
Much of the success and longevity of the AN/PVS-4 was due to the MX-9644 Image Intensifier tube. To make the tube more usable with simple optics, a second-generation MCP based image intensifier was adapted to an electrostatic inverter, similar to a first-generation image intensifier.

The result was that the tube produced an inverted image, simplifying the optical requirements of any night vision device that used it.

Although not a hybrid tube (Gen1 and Gen2 in the same tube housing) it nonetheless produced a gain of around 20,000 making it suitable for use under starlight only conditions and even overcast starlight conditions in remote locations.

=== Subsequent Image Intensifier Tube Development ===
The MX-9644 was later replaced by the MX-11620 Third-generation tube, which is a direct replacement for devices that were designed to use the MX-9644.

The MX-9644 tube was also continued in the form of the MX9644/UV which was a second generation tube although evidence exists that a further hybrid tube (Gen3 tube attached by FO to a Gen1 tube) was developed under this specification to provide far more gain, improved S/N and lower EBI. Hybrid tubes are capable of gains well in excess of 100,000 times. The Stinger Night Sight is a good example of Gen3+1 technology.

The ITT F4849 and ITT F4960 (MX-11619 and MX-11620) were also developed which use a 25mm Gen3 tube. As these tubes were proximity focussed, it was necessary to add a Fiber-Optic inverter to the tube to both extend the optical length of the device and the Gen3 photocathode was also mounted in some cases on a Fiber Optic plate rather than the usual Gen3 glass plate to match the focal point of the AN/PVS-4 optics. These tubes provided significant performance increase in gain but very little in the way of resolution.

Two other tube developments that occurred but were not widely manufactured included optical relays to invert the image both in front and behind a Gen3 25mm tube. This allowed for significant increases in tube resolution and performance over the FO based third generation tubes and involved a lens assembly being housed in a container that matched the MX-9644 tube exactly.

Related development for driving based devices included Fiber Optic expanders that magnified the image and could be retrofitted to driving scopes that also used this tube.

== Operation ==
Operation of the device is through two controls located on the left side of the tube housing.

The lower control is an on/off switch for the image intensifier tube and secondarily controls the gain of the tube, allowing the operator to control the brightness of the image.

The upper control is an on/off switch for the illuminated reticle and secondarily allows the brightness of the reticle to be adjusted.

Elevation and Windage adjustment is made through turrets located on the objective lens. Each click equals 1/4 moa.

=== Day/night adapter ===
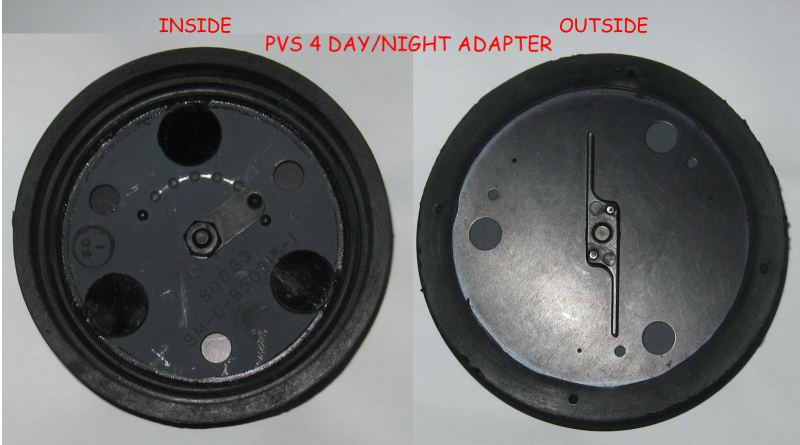
The Day/Night adapter allows use of the AN/PVS-4 during the day.

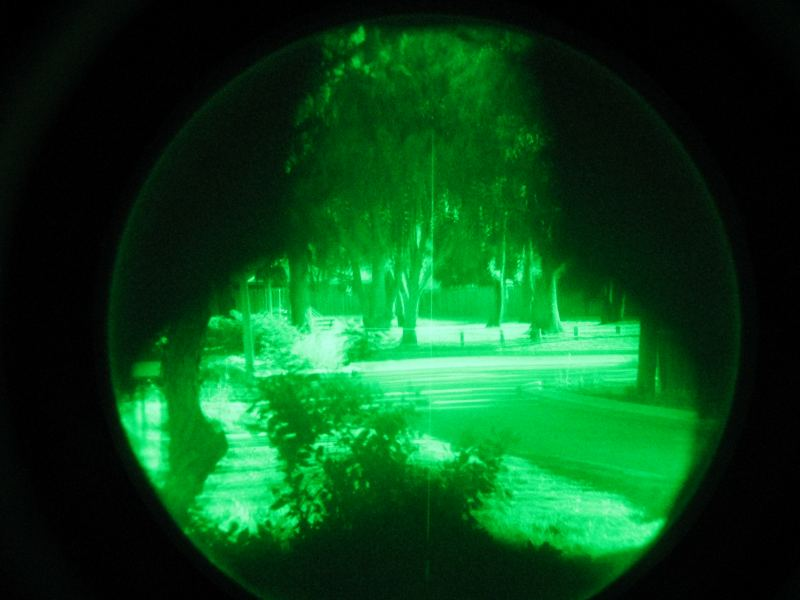
When the Day/Night adapter is used, the image field of view is reduced and appears triangular.

The AN/PVS4 also has a Day/Night adapter that allows sighting in of the units during the day time or for daytime operation of the sight. Under extremely bright nighttime conditions, it may be necessary to use this adapter.

The adapter consists of three hole sizes spaced evenly around the periphery

These pass by three larger aperture holes and three dark glass lenses to allow for six different levels of light reduction into the scope.

As a result, the AN/PVS-4 can be used in lighting conditions ranging from midday-sun in the desert, through to very-bright-moonlight and high levels of urban lighting.

Under moonlight or lower conditions, the AN/PVS-4 can be used without the adaptor and the ABC or Automatic Brightness Controls will reduce the gain, although the image may be too bright for the reticle to show correctly.

When used, the image of the AN/PVS-4 is reduced and appears somewhat triangular. Due to the small apertures and resulting light diffraction, focusing behavior differs from normal operation due to the increased depth of field.

== Limitations ==
In December 1974, the final AN/PVS-4 Development Test recorded the various shortcomings found during field testing. The majority of the issues were addressed in final production. Issues not addressed were deemed permissible.

Several issues noted were reliability, specifically with intensifier tubes being damaged due to moisture. This problem was fully addressed in final production. It was also noted the mount designed to secure the AN/PVS-4 to the M60 machine gun was difficult to install and prone to loss of zero. The sight reticles for both the M16 rifle and M14 rifle required firing a minimum of 20 rounds to seat before the zeroing procedures could begin, leading to an excessive expenditure of ammunition. The sight reticles were subsequently modified, requiring only 2 rounds for seating purposes. Early reticles for the M16/M203 could not be zeroed for each weapon simultaneously. Rubber eye guard separation from the sight was a common problem that was addressed.

An example of a noted shortcoming ultimately considered insignificant was an enemies ability to detect the reflection of the AN/PVS-4 objective lens using an active infrared night vision device. The IR device needed to detect the AN/PVS-4 required a straight-on unobstructed view, and AN/PVS-4 detection only occurred using an active device (as opposed to passive). The IR light emitted from the enemy's active device would be clearly observable to a anyone employing an AN/PVS-4, making the enemies position easily known.

Reticle burn-in was also addressed. One issue that persists even in production models is the tendency for the projected reticle pattern to become washed out in bright light. This can be somewhat mitigated by adjusting the Reticle Brightness knob to its brightest position and keeping the Tube Brightness knob as low as possible.

== Variants ==
Although not specifically considered "variants" there are a number of other models that share the AN/PVS-4 lineage and often use interchangeable components, including the image intensifier tube.

The addition of a "A" after the model, e.g., AN/PVS-4A, signifies a third-generation image intensifier tube and may be designated either after upgrade or at original manufacture. "A" variants typically use "AA" batteries.

=== AN/TVS-5 ===
The AN/TVS-5 is an observation scope, although it does come with reticles and can be used as a weapon sight as well. With a larger catadioptric lens and higher zoom level, it is rated with a detection range of over 1 Kilometer with a third-generation image intensifier tube.

=== NVS-700 ===
The NVS-700 is the original designation of the Optic Electronics Corp. AN/PVS-4. This model is also manufactured in Iran.

=== NVS-800 ===
The NVS-800 is the original des of the Optic Electronics Corp. AN/TVS-5. This model is also manufactured in Iran.

=== Auto NVS-1 ===
Observation version of the AN/PVS-4 without a reticle, manufactured in Iran.

=== Auto NVS-2 ===
Binocular version of AN/PVS-4 without reticle, manufactured in Iran.

=== NVS-T 700 ===
Individual Night Vision Sight, With Reticle, manufactured in Iran.

=== NVS-T 800 ===
Binocular Night Vision scope, based on AN/TVS-5, manufactured in Iran.

=== IWS NL-84 ===
AN/PVS-4 made in Israel by New Noga Light.

=== NL-87 ===
AN/TVS-5 derivative made in Israel by New Noga Light.

=== Star-Tron ===
The Star-Tron 426 is a surveillance device designed to make use of the Civilian version of the MX9644 tube, the F4845. It is thought that the F4845 were tubes that did not pass the milspec requirements.

=== NVM-4 ===
A small surveillance scope intended primarily for Law Enforcement use, that is designed specifically to use surplus MX9644 tubes from AN/PVS-4s that are upgraded to Gen III tubes.

=== ITT's F4960 Stinger night sight ===
A direct descendant of the AN/PVS-4 using an advanced Gen III+I F4844 Image tube, it is capable of identifying targets at ranges of up to seven kilometers. It is intended as the sighting mechanism for the Stinger missile. It features as 2.26x zoom and a 23.5 degree field of view.

== Reticles ==
One of the unique capabilities of the AN/PVS-4 that is not available in many other night vision weapon sights is the field-changeable reticles.

By replacing the reticle, the AN/PVS-4 is able to provide service to a wider variety of weapons than any other weapon sight including Squad Automatic Weapons, rocket launchers, grenade launchers, Shoulder-launched Multipurpose Assault Weapons and recoilless rifles.

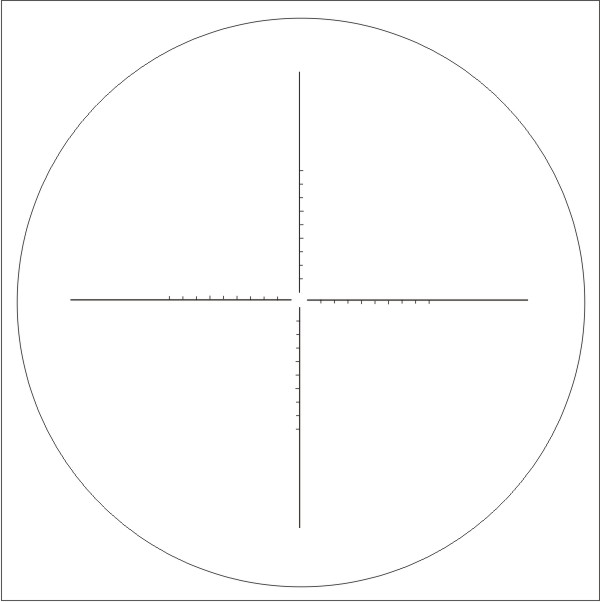
Mildot-type reticle

=== Crosshair ===
The crosshair is the most basic reticle for the AN/PVS-4 and is available as either a simple crosshair, A mildot crosshair or as an aimpoint crosshair.

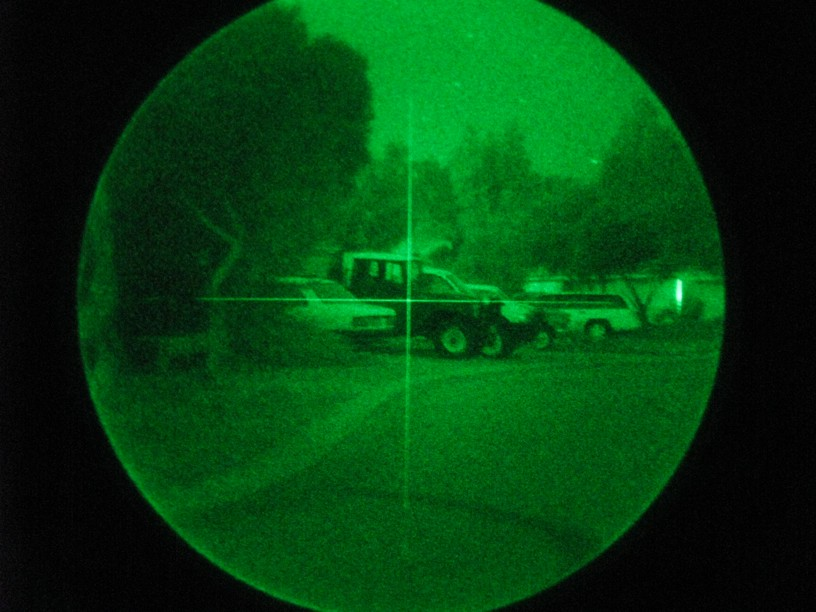
A simple crosshair reticle can be seen on the photo taken through a surveillance AN/PVS-4. The image was taken during a wide-area blackout on a moonless night in a remote suburban area.

=== M16/M203/M79 ===
The M16 reticle features a range-estimator and a three-point cross-hair that provides an aiming point for close range, 200m and 400m. The same reticle is also used for the M203 and the M79.

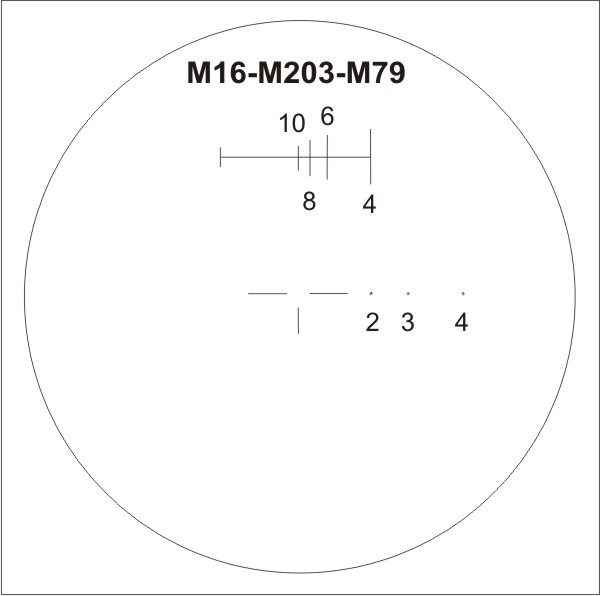
M16/M203/M79 reticle

=== M60/M14/M249 ===
The M60 reticle is similar to the M16 reticle but contains points rather than crosshairs for 200m, 400m and 600m. This reticle is used for the M14 and M249 also.

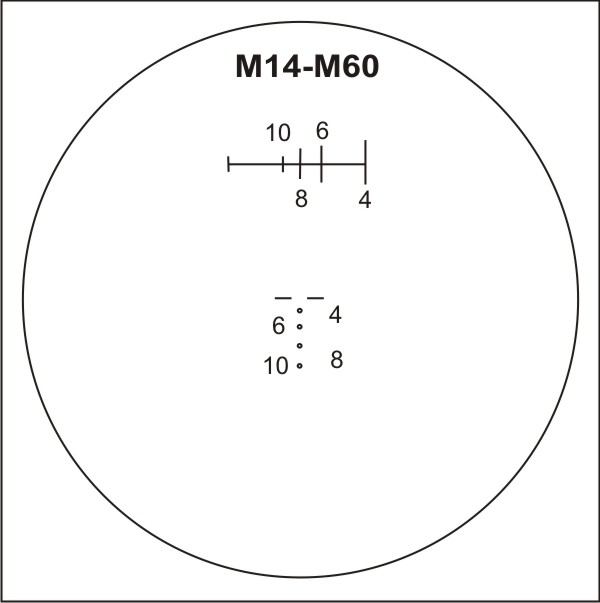
M14-M60

=== M72A1 ===
The M72A1 reticle contains a rangefinder with marks for 100, 200, and 300 metres. This sight is used on the M72 LAW.

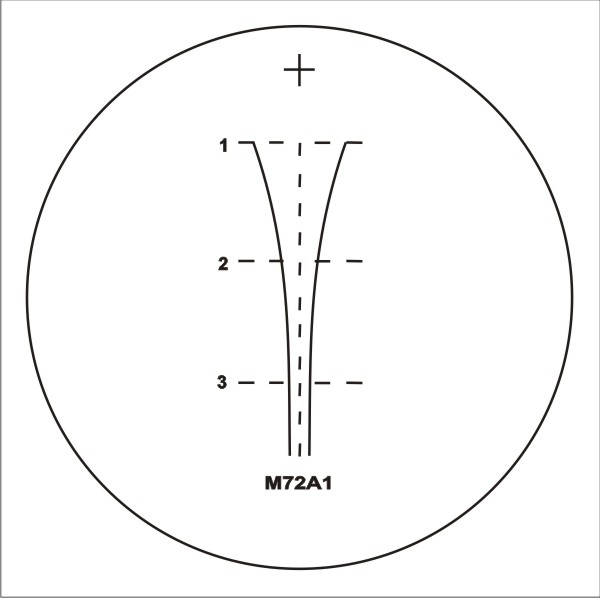
M72A1 reticle

=== M67 ===
The M67 reticle is similar to the M72A1 reticle, but contains range marks for 200, 400, 600, and 800 metres.

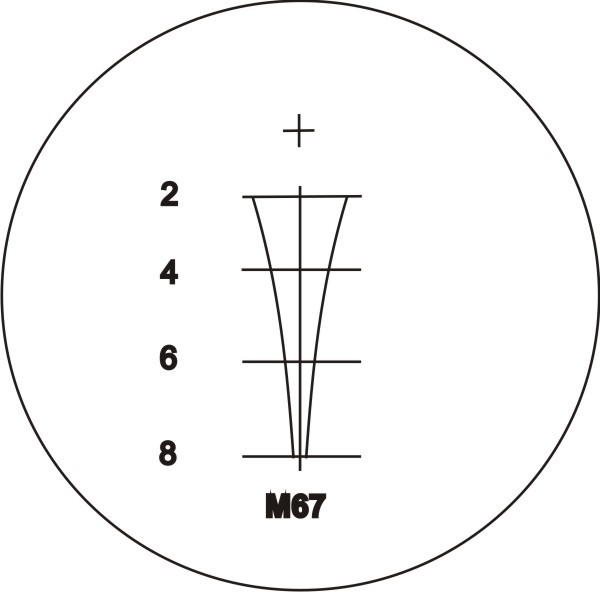
M67 reticle

=== F4960 Stinger night sight ===
The Stinger reticle is very different in that it is a rear-mounted illuminated reticle -the reticle is built into the tube and positioned on top of the screen so both the screen and reticle are in focus. It also allows red-on-green illumination which makes the reticle stand out. The top circle is the range finding circle and the lower three locations are for sighting.

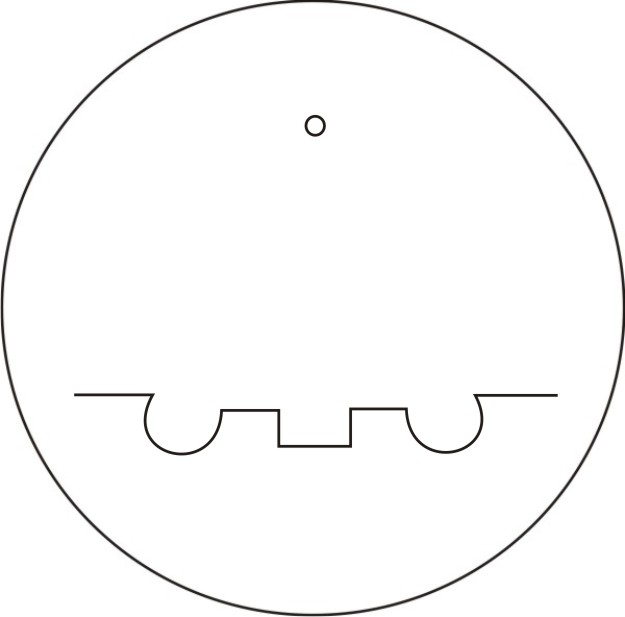
Stinger night sight reticle

== Location of manufacture ==
The AN/PVS-4 is one of the most widely manufactured night vision sights in the world, with many countries making their own version either under license to the US or as a variant.

=== US manufacturers ===
Originally manufactured by Optic-Electronic Corp in Texas, also manufactured by Varo (Litton), ITT and Northrop Grumman and Ni-Tec Inc. in Niles Illinois.

=== Pakistan ===
The Institute Of Optronics (IOP) manufactures the AN/PVS-4 and AN/TVS-5 under license.

=== Germany ===
Euroatlas manufacture the AN/PVS-4 and AN/TVS-5 Night Vision Sights under license.

=== Iran ===
Iran Electronics Industries manufacture the NVS-700(AN/PVS-4) and NVS-800(AN/TVS-5)

=== Singapore ===
Thales Optronics Systems manufacture the NVS-700(AN/PVS-4) and NVS-800(AN/TVS-5)

=== Israel ===
New Noga Light, a subsidiary of Star Night Technologies, manufactures a range of NVDs including the NL84, NL87 and NL89 variants of the AN/PVS4, AN/TVS5 and AN/PVS20

== Alternative use ==
=== Surveillance ===
The AN/PVS-4 is also commonly used for surveillance operations and surplus units are commonly donated to police forces.

There are also surveillance model derivatives specifically designed to use civilian versions of the tube, such as the Star-Tron, which uses the ITT F4845 25mm tube.

Additionally, companies such as AB Night Vision also produce after-market surveillance device housings such as the NVM-4A for law enforcement and civilian use that take surplus military MX9644 tubes.

=== Astronomy ===
Due to its availability and affordability, the AN/PVS-4 has been used very successfully in the realm of electronically assisted astronomy. Astronomers have adapted the AN/PVS-4 for use with telescopes and other celestial observation equipment.

== Summary ==
Despite being obsoleted by newer technology, especially third-generation night vision, the AN/PVS-4 is still a capable device and still far exceeds the quality of many contemporary civilian devices.

While considered an older scope, it still shows up from time to time as a second-hand or used item at weapon shows and through private sales, although good quality units are still sought after and difficult to come by.

Although the military is phasing this unit out, older devices are frequently donated to police services for reuse and so the AN/PVS-4 is likely to remain in use for some time.

== Cultural impact and civilian ownership ==
Although the AN/PVS-4 is one of the best-known night vision devices, it is not a commonly recognized device. Up until recent times, prohibitive costs and availability limitations on devices such as the AN/PVS-4 resulted in very few items being available outside of the Military.

Because of the limited availability of 25mm image intensifier tubes and housings to civilians, and what AN/PVS-4s did become available tended to have well used tubes and as a result, civilians tended to avoid buying them.

The availability of third-generation riflescopes of higher quality for professionals would have provided another option for shooters while the lower cost of first-generation consumer night vision devices would have led to lower end consumers purchasing cheaper imported scopes.

However the AN/PVS-4 is considered by reviewers to able to withstand high recoil, making it popular among enthusiasts who are able to get a reasonable good condition item .

The optics are considered exceptional, even by contemporary standards and the biggest drawback compared to modern scopes is the weight.

Although the AN/PVS-4 has not had a great deal of cultural impact, its legacy of high quality night vision has become a staple of movies and television shows which often do not show real equipment.

As a result, very few people that do not have military, firearm or night-vision experience are likely to recognize one visually.

== Users ==
- Australia: Formerly used by ground defence units of the Royal Australian Air Force
- Georgia: Used by Georgian Armed Forces and police Special Task Units.
- Spain: Grupo Especial de Operaciones (Special Operations Group, GEO)
- Turkey: Formerly used by the Turkish Land Forces
- United States: Formerly used by the U.S. Marine Corps
- Canada: The AN/PVS-4 was used by the Canadian Armed forces under the designation AN/PVS-503 complete with its own unique markings on the housing. As well as the AN/TVS-5 for use on crew served weapons.

== See also ==
- Joint Electronics Type Designation System – Unclassified designation system for United States military electronic equipment
- Night Vision Device – Device that lets the user see in levels of visible light approaching total darkness
- List of military electronics of the United States
