= Arms industry =

Industrial sector which manufactures weapons and military technology and equipment

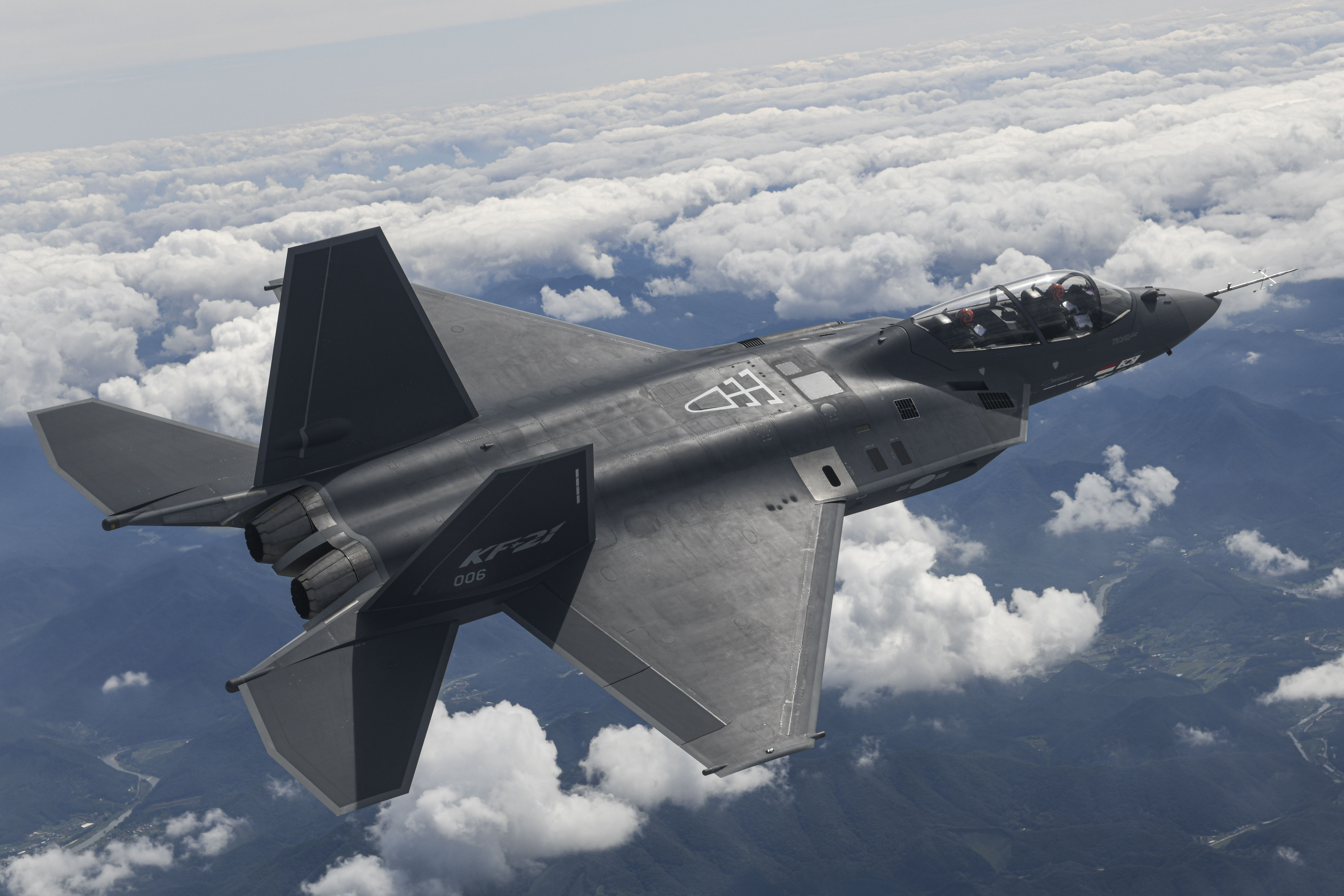
KF-21 Boramae fighter aircraft in 2026

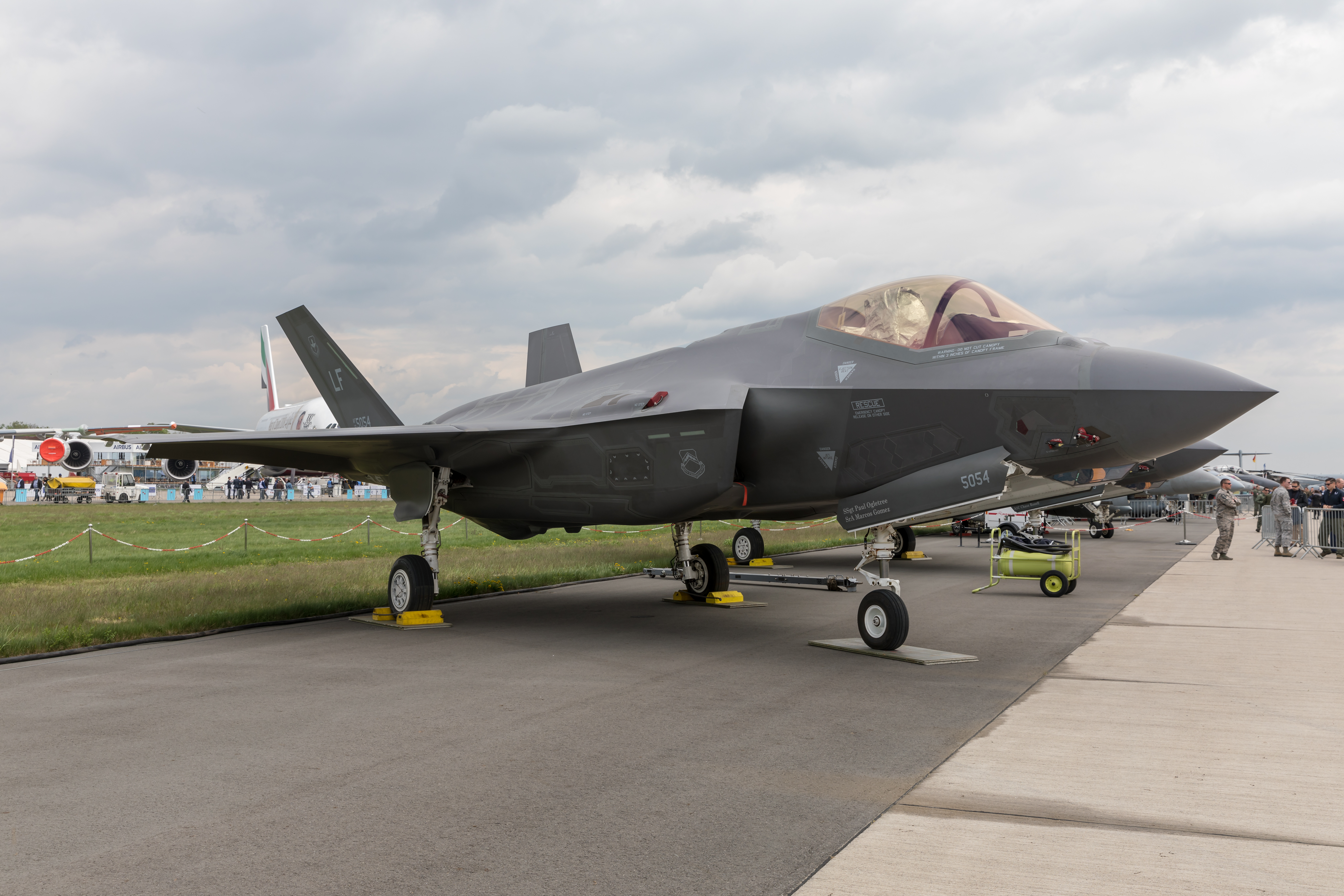
F-35A Lightning II fighter aircraft at the ILA Berlin Air Show in 2018

The arms industry, also known as the defense (or defence) industry or military industry is a global industry which manufactures and sells weapons and other military technology to a variety of customers, including the armed forces of states and civilian individuals and organizations. Products of the arms industry include weapons, munitions, weapons platforms, communications systems, and other electronics, and related equipment. The arms industry also provides defense-related services, such as logistical and operational support. As a matter of policy, many governments of industrialized countries maintain or support a network of organizations, facilities, and resources to produce weapons and equipment for their military forces (and sometimes those of other countries). This is often referred to as a defense industrial base. Entities involved in arms production for military purposes vary widely, and include private sector commercial firms, state-owned enterprises and public sector organizations, and scientific and academic institutions. Such entities perform a wide variety of functions, including research and development, engineering, production, and servicing of military material, equipment, and facilities. The weapons they produce are often made, maintained, and stored in arsenals.

In some regions of the world, there is a substantial legal trade in firearms for use by individuals (commonly cited purposes include self-defense and hunting/sporting). Illegal small arms trade occurs in many countries and regions affected by political instability.

== History ==
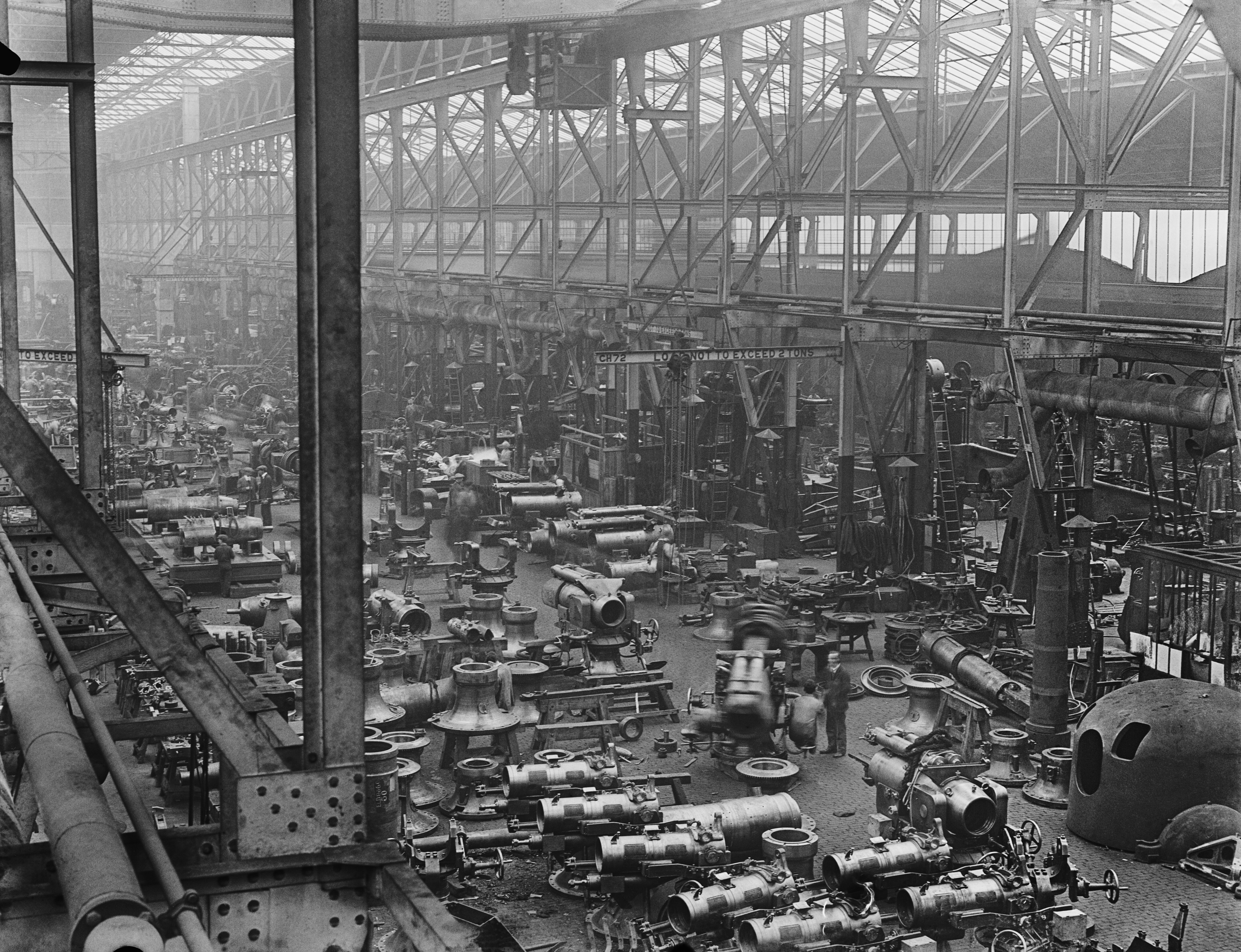
Coventry Ordnance Works producing naval artillery during World War I

Military technology evolved slowly until the 19th century when a quartet of factors suddenly globalized the arms trade. First, accelerating technical innovation created a shifting frontier of desirable weapons. Second, the development of mass production allowed technically advanced weapons to be exported at scale. Third, private firms, rather than government arsenals, became leaders in the manufacture of arms. And finally, global communications and transport networks facilitated long-distance trade. Early leading arms makers included Schneider-Creusot, Krupp, Vickers, and Armstrong Whitworth. These firms were encouraged both by market conditions and by their home nations to export far outside of Europe to areas such as South America, Asia, the Near East, and Africa as part of the 19th century vogue for imperialism.

During the early modern period, England, France, Sweden, and the Netherlands became self-sufficient in arms production, with diffusion and migration of skilled workers to more peripheral countries such as Portugal and Russia.

The modern arms industry emerged in the second half of the nineteenth century as a product of the creation and expansion of the first large military–industrial companies. As smaller countries and even newly industrializing countries like Russia and Japan could no longer produce cutting-edge military equipment with their indigenous capacity-based resources, they increasingly began to outsource the manufacture of military equipment, such as battleships, artillery pieces and rifles to foreign government military entities. In 1854, the British government awarded a contract to the Elswick Ordnance Company to supply the latest loading artillery pieces. This galvanized the private sector into weapons production, with the surplus increasingly exported to foreign countries. William Armstrong became one of the first international arms dealers, selling his systems to governments across the world from Brazil to Japan. In 1884, he opened a shipyard at Elswick to specialize in warship production – at the time, it was the only factory in the world that could build a battleship and arm it completely. The factory produced warships for foreign naval forces, including the Imperial Japanese Navy. Several Armstrong cruisers played an important role in defeating the Russian fleet at the Battle of Tsushima in 1905. In the American Civil War in 1861 the North had about ten times the manufacturing capacity of the economy of the Confederate States of America. This advantage over the South included the ability to produce (in relatively small numbers) breech-loading rifles for use against the muzzle-loading rifles of the South. This began the transition to industrially produced mechanized weapons such as the Gatling gun.

This industrial innovation in the defense industry was adopted by Prussia in its 1864, 1866, and 1870–71 defeats of Denmark, Austria, and, France respectively. By this time the machine gun had begun entering arsenals. The first examples of its effectiveness were in 1899 during the Boer War and in 1905 during the Russo-Japanese War. However, Germany led the innovation of weapons and this advantage in the weapons of World War I nearly defeated the allies.

In 1885, France decided to capitalize on this increasingly lucrative trade and repealed its ban on weapon exports. The regulatory framework for the period up to the First World War was characterized by a laissez-faire policy that placed little obstruction in the way of weapons exports. Due to the carnage of World War I, arms traders began to be regarded with odium as merchants of death and were accused of having instigated and perpetuated the war for earning their profits from weapons sales. An inquiry into these allegations in Britain failed to find evidence to support them. However, the sea change in attitude about war more generally meant that governments began to control and regulate the trade themselves.

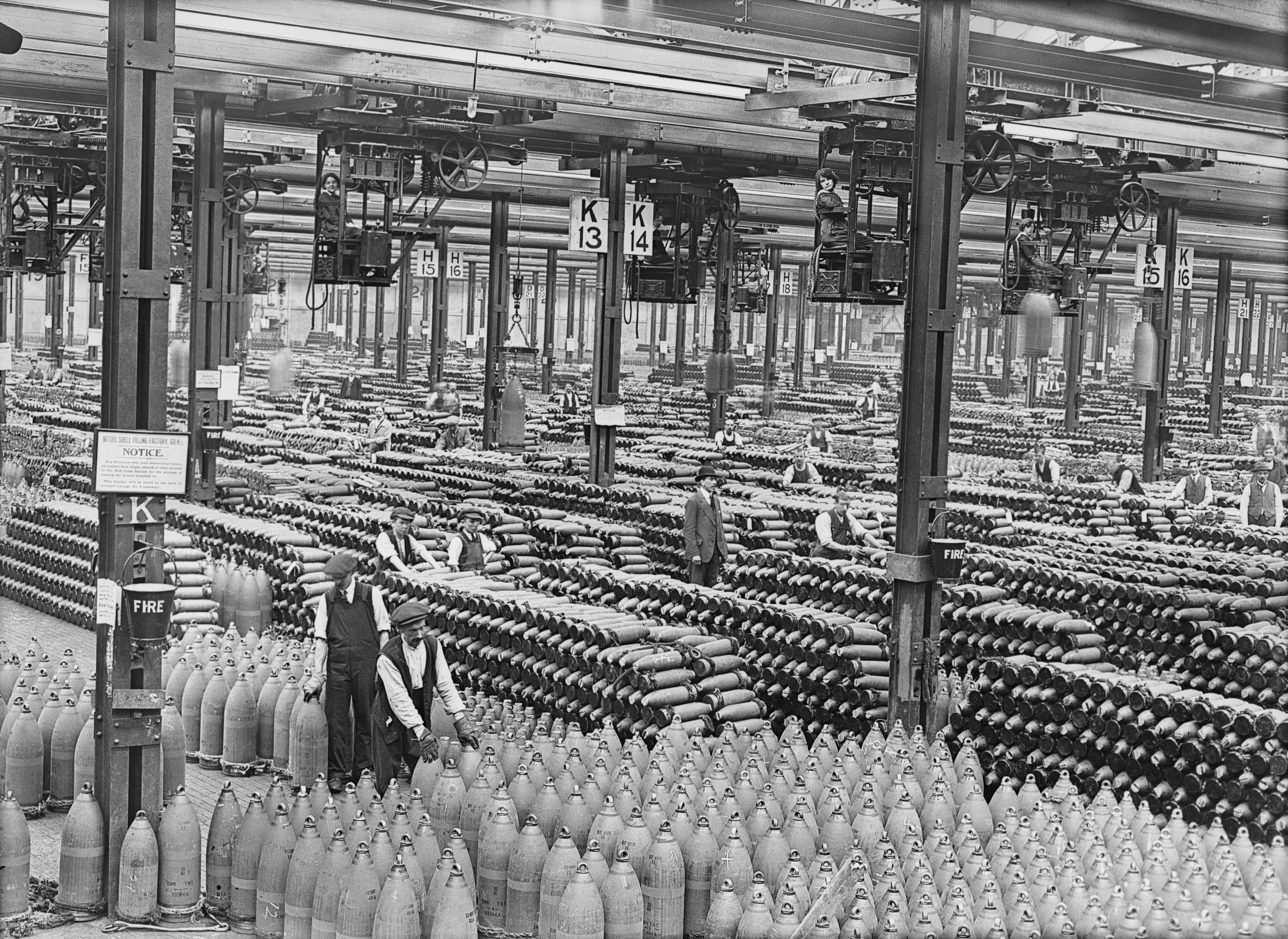
Stacks of shells in the National Shell Filling Factory, Chilwell during World War I

For much of the time after the First World War, a national defence industry was treated by many countries as an element of their national sovereignty, and the emergence of collaborative international projects did not occur until the latter part of the Cold War.

The volume of the arms trade greatly increased during the later 20th century, and it began to be used as a political tool, especially during the Cold War when the United States and the USSR supplied weapons to their proxies across the world, particularly third world countries (see Nixon Doctrine).

== Sectors ==
=== Land-based weapons ===
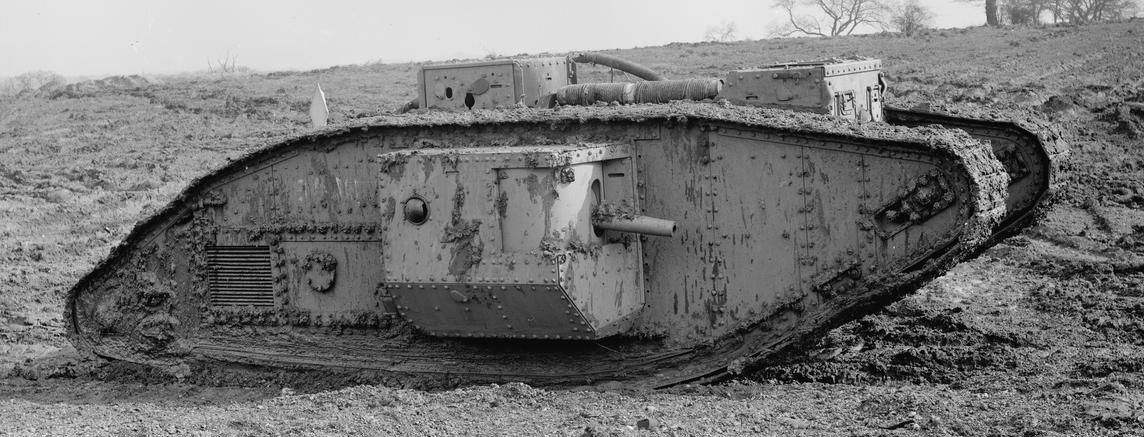
British Mark V tank

This category includes everything from light arms to heavy artillery, and the majority of producers are small. Many are located in third-world countries. International trade in handguns, machine guns, tanks, armored personnel carriers, and other relatively inexpensive weapons is substantial. There is relatively little regulation at the international level, and as a result, many weapons fall into the hands of organized crime, rebel forces, terrorists, or regimes under sanctions.

==== Small arms ====
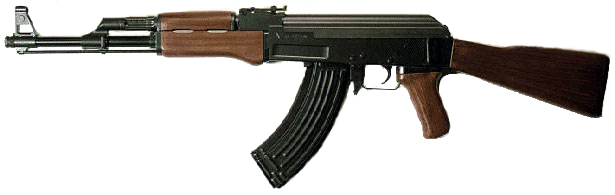
The AK series of weapons have been produced in greater numbers than any other firearm and have been used in conflicts all over the world.

One billion firearms were in global circulation in 2017; of those, 857 million (85%) were possessed by civilians, 133 million (13%) were possessed by national militaries, and 23 million (2%) belonged to law enforcement agencies. 1,135 companies based in more than 98 countries manufactured small arms as well as their various components and ammunition as of 2003.

=== Aerospace systems ===
Encompassing military aircraft (both land-based and naval aviation), conventional missiles, and military satellites, this is the most technologically advanced sector of the market. It is also the least competitive from an economic standpoint, with a handful of companies dominating the entire market. The top clients and major producers are virtually all located in the western world and Russia, with the United States easily in the first place. Prominent aerospace firms include Rolls-Royce, BAE Systems, Saab AB, Dassault Aviation, Sukhoi, Mikoyan, EADS, Leonardo, Thales Group, Lockheed Martin, Northrop Grumman, RTX Corporation, and Boeing. There are also several multinational consortia mostly involved in the manufacturing of fighter jets, such as the Eurofighter. The largest military contract in history, signed in October 2001, involved the development of the Joint Strike Fighter.

=== Naval systems ===
Several of the world's great powers maintain substantial naval forces to provide a global presence, with the largest nations possessing aircraft carriers, nuclear submarines and advanced anti-air defense systems. The vast majority of military ships are conventionally powered, but some are nuclear-powered. There is also a large global market in second-hand naval vessels, generally purchased by developing countries from Western governments.

=== Cybersecurity ===
The cybersecurity industry is expected to be of increasing importance to defense, intelligence, and homeland security agencies.

== International arms transfers ==
=== Over time ===
==== 2010–2014 ====
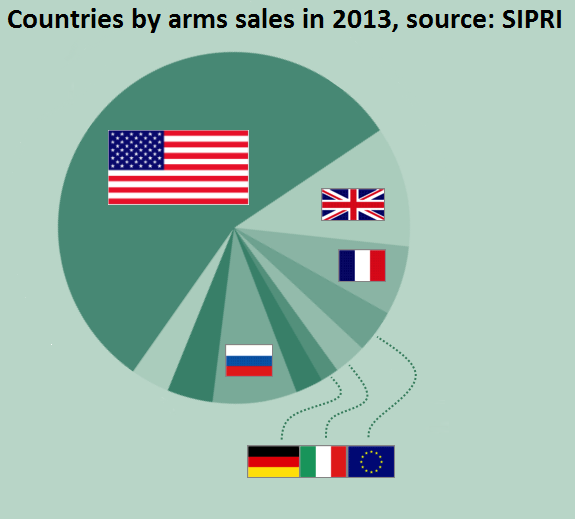
Share of arms sales by country in 2013. Source is provided by SIPRI.

According to research institute SIPRI, the volume of international transfers of major weapons in 2010–14 was 16 percent higher than in 2005–2009. The five biggest exporters in 2010–2014 were the United States, Russia, China, Germany, and France, and the five biggest importers were India, Saudi Arabia, China, the United Arab Emirates, and Pakistan. The flow of arms to the Middle East increased by 87 percent between 2009–13 and 2014–18, while there was a decrease in flows to all other regions: Africa, the Americas, Asia and Oceania, and Europe.

==== 2014–2018 ====
SIPRI has identified 67 countries as exporters of major weapons in 2014–18. The top 5 exporters during the period were responsible for 75 percent of all arms exports. The composition of the five largest exporters of arms changed between 2014 and 2018 and remained unchanged compared to 2009–13, although their combined total exports of major arms were 10 percent higher. In 2014–18, significant increases in arms exports from the US, France and Germany were seen, while Chinese exports rose marginally and Russian exports decreased.

In 2014–18, 155 countries (about three-quarters of all countries) imported major weapons. The top 5 recipients accounted for 33 percent of the total arms imports during the period. The top five arms importers – Saudi Arabia, India, Egypt, Australia, and Algeria – accounted for 35 percent of total arms imports in 2014–18. Of these, Saudi Arabia and India were among the top five importers in both 2009–13 and 2014–18.

In 2014–18, the volume of major arms international transfers was 7.8 percent higher than in 2009–13 and 23 percent higher than that in 2004–08. The largest arms importer was Saudi Arabia, importing arms primarily from the United States, United Kingdom, and France. Between 2009–13 and 2014–18, the flow of arms to the Middle East increased by 87 percent. Also including India, Egypt, Australia, and Algeria, the top five importers received 35 percent of the total arms imports, during 2014–18. The five largest exporters were the United States, Russia, France, Germany and China.

==== Post-2021 ====
The global volume of major arms transferred between states in 2021-2025 was 9.2 per cent higher than in the previous five-year period (2016–20). This was the biggest increase since 2011-15. Arm imports by states in Europe more than trebled between the two periods (+210 per cent). The five largest arms importers in 2021–25 were Ukraine, India, Saudi Arabia, Qatar and Pakistan, while the five largest arms exporters were the United States, France, Russia, Germany and China.

=== World's largest arms exporters ===
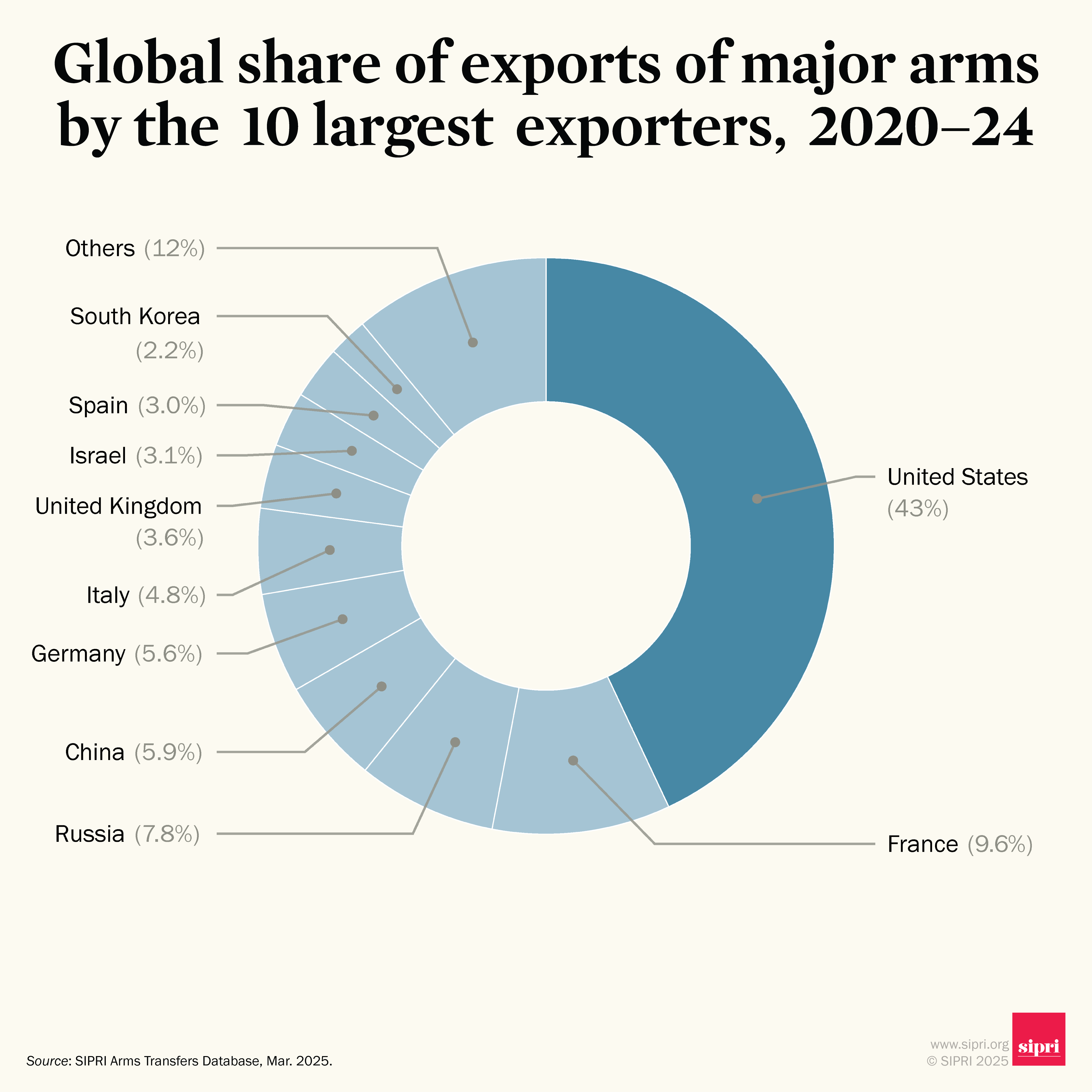
Global share of exports of major arms by the 10 largest eporters, 2020–2024

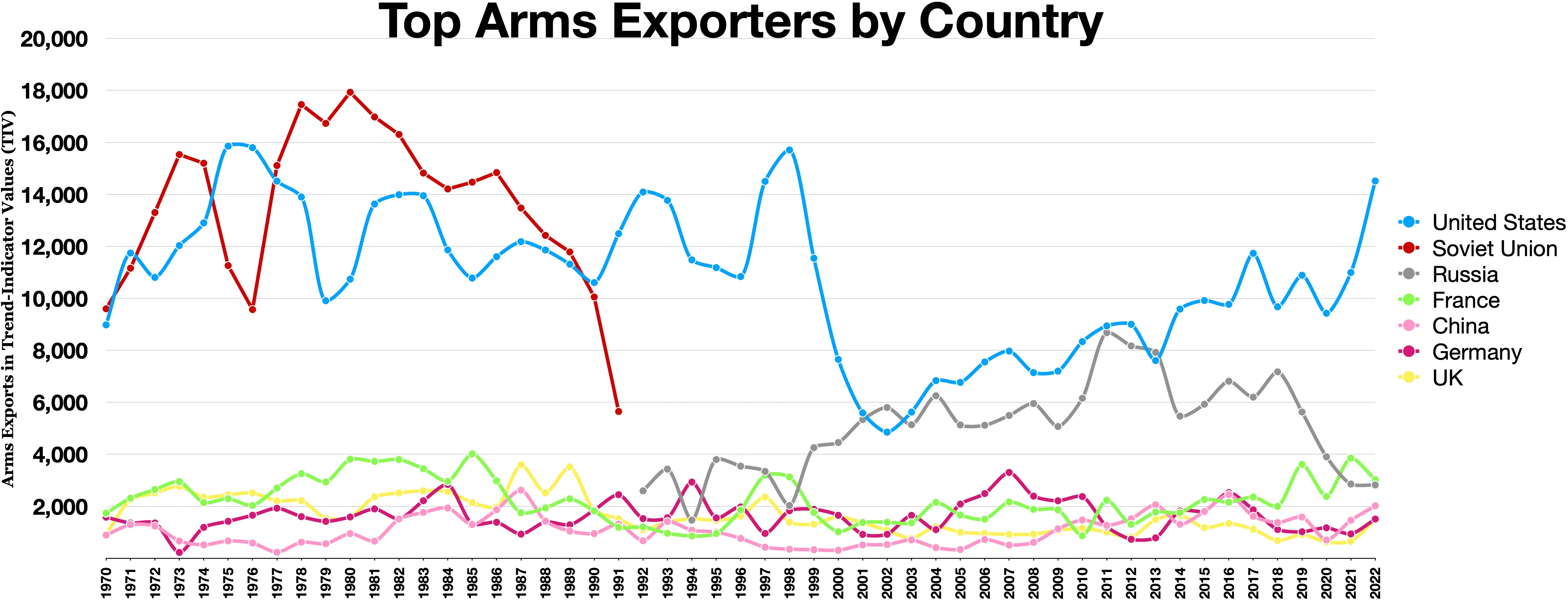
Top arms exporters by country in Trend-Indicator Values (TIV)

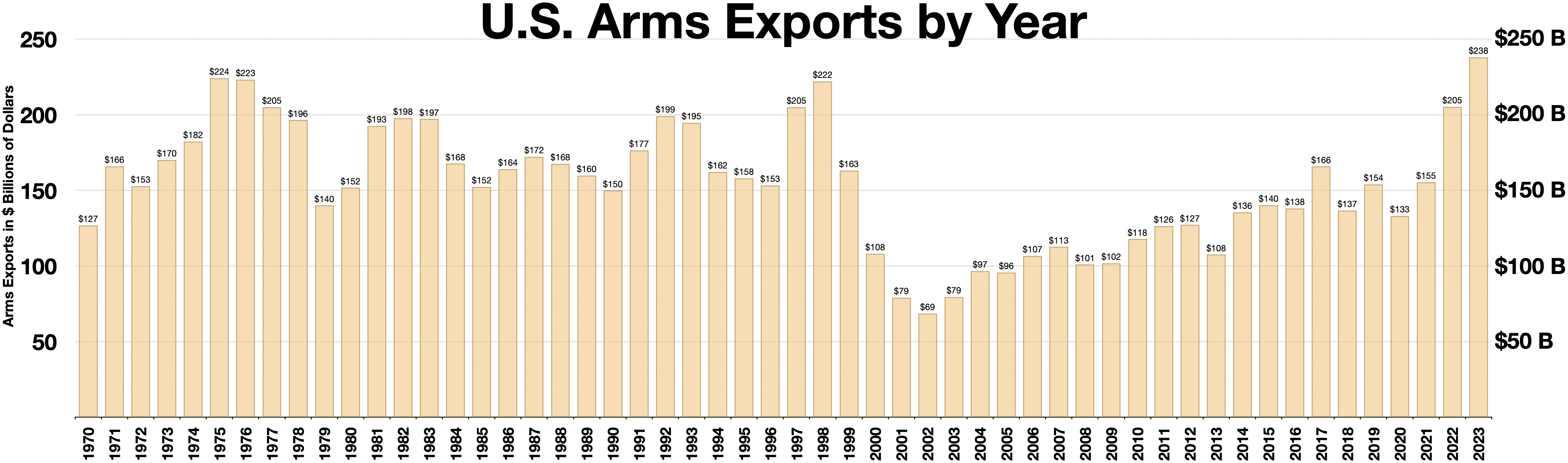
U.S. arms exports by year. The U.S. exported $238 billion in arms in 2023.

The following are estimates from the Stockholm International Peace Research Institute's Arms Transfers Database.

2021-2025 rank	Exporter	Share of global arms exports (%)
1	United States	42
2	France	9.8
3	Russia	6.8
4	Germany	5.7
5	China	5.6
6	Italy	5.1
7	Israel	4.4
8	United Kingdom	3.4
9	Republic of Korea	3.0
10	Spain	2.3

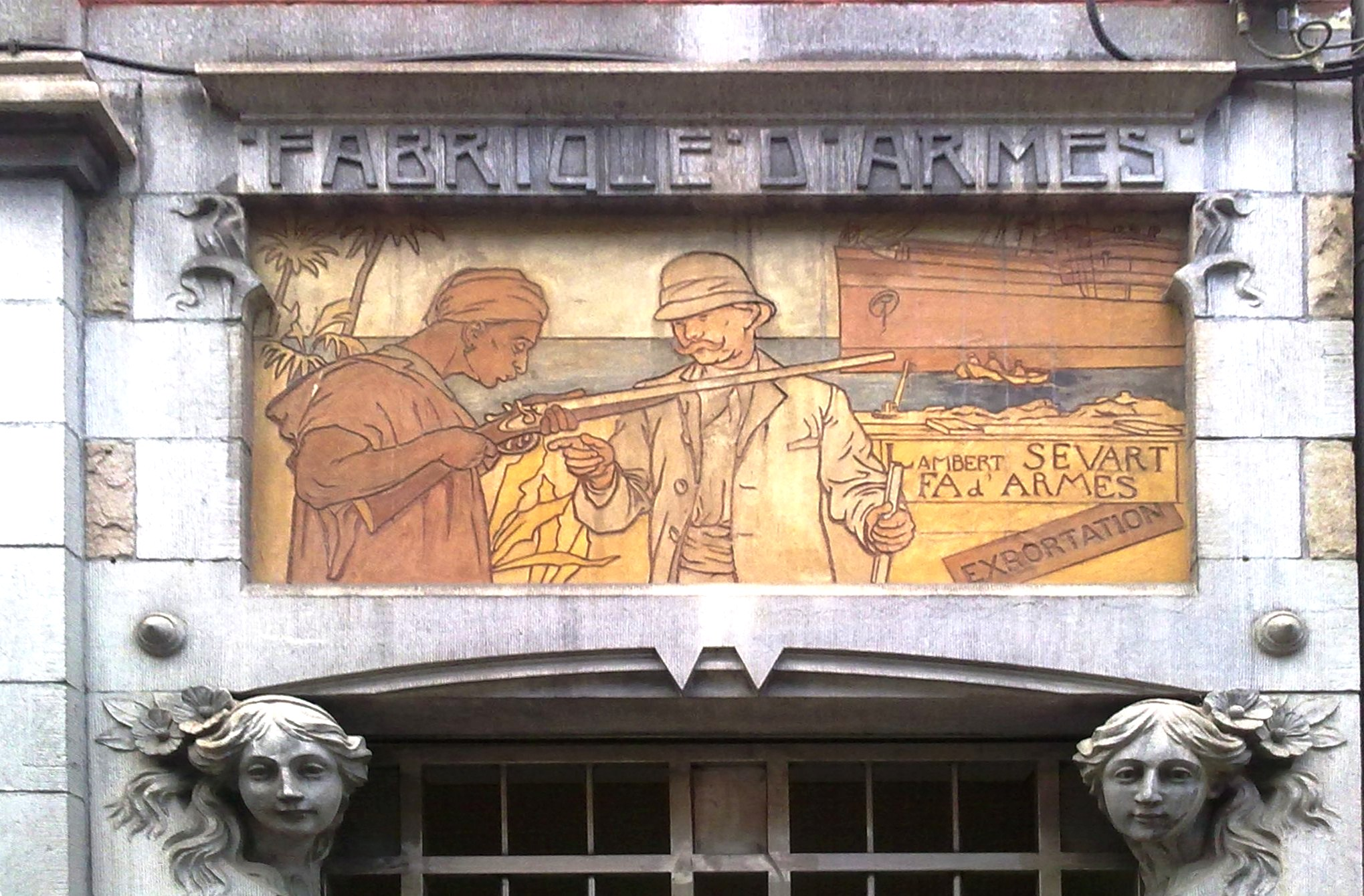
Sgraffito at the Lambert Sevart weapons factory, in Liege (Belgium) (early 20th century)

SIPRI has identified 66 states as suppliers of major arms in 2021-25. The five largest suppliers during that period—the USA, France, Russia, Germany and China—accounted for 70 per cent of all arms exports. US, French, German and Chinese arms exports rose between 2016–20 and 2021–25, while Russian exports fell sharply. States in North America and Western Europe together accounted for 74 per cent of all arms exports in 2021-25 compared with 62 per cent in 2016-20.

=== World's largest arms exporters since 1950 ===
SIPRI uses the "trend-indicator values" (TIV). These are based on the known unit production costs of weapons and represent the transfer of military resources rather than the financial value of the transfer.

1950–2025 rank	Supplier	Arms export (in billion TIV)
1	United States	767,217
2	Soviet Union (1950-1991)	454,224
3	Russia (1992–present)	161,494
4	United Kingdom	146,592
5	France	144,131
6	Germany	96,449
7	China	66,736
8	Italy	41,521
9	Czechoslovakia (1950-1992)	31,223
10	Netherlands	27,089

=== World's largest arms importers ===
Arms import rankings fluctuate heavily as countries enter and exit wars. Accordingly, 5-year moving averages present a much more accurate picture of import volume, free from yearly fluctuations.

2021-2025 rank	Importer	Share of global arms imports (in %)
1	Ukraine	9.7
2	India	8.2
3	Saudi Arabia	6.8
4	Qatar	6.4
5	Pakistan	4.2
6	Japan	3.9
7	Poland	3.6
8	United States	2.9
9	Kuwait	2.8
10	Australia	2.8

In the period from 2021 to 2025 the top five recipients-Ukraine, India, Saudi Arabia, Qatar and Pakistan- received 35 per cent of total global arms imports in the period. In 2021-25 Europe was the region with the largest share of total global arms imports (33 per cent) for the first time since the 1960s. Asia and Oceania (31 per cent) was the next largest, followed by the Middle East (26 per cent), the Americas (5.6 per cent) and Africa (4.3 per cent).

=== List of major weapon manufacturers ===
This is a list of the world's largest arms manufacturers and other military service companies who profit the most from the war economy, their origin is shown as well. The information is based on a list published by the Stockholm International Peace Research Institute for 2025.

2024 rank	Company name	Arms revenue (US$ billions)	% of total revenue from arms
1	(United States) Lockheed Martin	64.65	91
2	(United States) RTX Corporation	43.60	54
3	(United States) Northrop Grumman	37.85	92
4	(United Kingdom) BAE Systems	33.79	95
5	(United States) General Dynamics	33.63	70
6	(United States) Boeing	30.55	46
7	(Russia) Rostec	27.12	70
8	Aviation Industry Corporation of China	20.32	25
9	China Electronics Technology Group Corporation	18.92	34
10	(United States) L3Harris Technologies	16.21	76
11	(China) NORINCO	13.97	23
12	(Italy) Leonardo	13.83	72
13	(European Union) Airbus	13.37	18
14	China State Shipbuilding Corporation	12.33	25
15	(France) Thales	11.88	53
16	(United States) Huntington Ingalls Industries	10.28	89
17	China Aerospace Science and Technology Corporation	10.23	30
18	(United States) Leidos	9.37	56
19	(United States) Amentum	8.33	60
20	(Germany) Rheinmetall	8.24	78

== Economics of the arms industry ==
=== Market failures ===
... in all countries, markets for military goods work poorly. This is to a large extent independent of the constitution of the state and the social and economic system. In all countries, whether ownership is private or collective, and whether rulers are democratic or authoritarian, the agents on each side of the defense market are powerful and well connected. On one side a senior minister manages a government monopsony: there is only one significant customer for such items as heavy artillery, aircraft, and battleships. On the other side is a charmed circle of big defense contractors. A few large-scale corporations supply such weapons; their ability to squeeze money out of government is augmented by the fact that they are too important for production, employment, and national security for the government to let them fail. As a direct result, defense markets everywhere are notorious for cost overruns, delayed deliveries, quality shortfalls, subsidies, and kickbacks. It would be a mistake, however, to conclude that defense markets everywhere are uniformly the same.

— Harrison & Markevich

A free market for weapons cannot exist within a state because the market is necessarily a monopsony where there is a single buyer and a small number of suppliers. The high cost of weapons together with the lack of a free market makes pricing controversial and allegations of corruption and inefficiency common. Furthermore, the complexity and specialization involved in weapons together with barriers to entry created by the government procurement process frequently result in monopolistic situations where suppliers are able to charge high prices and dictate long delivery times. The cyclic nature of the business has driven consolidation which further impedes pricing.

While profiteering by the arms industry is frequently blamed for the costs of defense procurement, a comparison between commercial and defense companies found little difference in profitability. Rather, cost overruns appear to be caused by a variety of complicated factors inherent in the structure of military procurement including needless levels of technological sophistication, a bidding process that rewards underbidding, a profit formula that rewards inefficiency by paying contractors a percentage of the total cost, procurement organization structure that hampers decision-making, and concurrent engineering that requires rework of already produced equipment. Technological determinism may arise where competition between weapons systems drives relentless development of new weapons, not because they are needed, but because they are possible. Pressure on the US government has resulted in an inefficient procurement system where the government negotiates with the objective of low contractor profit rather than low overall cost.

Poorly managed procurement during the American Civil War resulted in generals and states competing against each other when buying arms which resulted in a seller’s market where prices were ten times higher than before the war and the goods were sometimes unusable. Similar problems occurred at the start of WWII before procurement was centralized to the War Production Board to prevent useless competition.

Bids for government contracts may involve collusion among the bidders to extract exorbitant profits. High profitability of companies involved in the manufacture of armor plate for ships resulting from their anti-competitive tactics around the year 1900 lead to much public controversy. This culminated in the Budget and Accounting Act of 1921 to limit the sort of abuses perpetrated by the nickel-steel cartel. The period leading up to WWI saw Navy Department funds being used as a source of federal patronage.

A continuing community of interests between the military and industry creates the potential for an old boy network in control of weapons procurement that threatens the public interest. This may involve a revolving door dynamic were personnel frequently change their employment between government and private industry, thus making their allegiance unclear. Elizabeth Warren said that there is a widespread practice of American defense contractors hiring former US Government officials. She said that hundreds of such cases exist and that they constitute a revolving door that creates "at minimum, the appearance of corruption and favoritism".

=== International trade ===
Multinational corporations form a global network stitched together by reciprocal agreements and interlocking ownership that may pursue objectives contrary to that of the nations whose resources they employ. For example, the English arms maker Vickers supplied field guns to Germany prior to 1914. These guns were then used against British troops during WWI.

Furthermore, a tradeoff exists between procuring the best specialized parts and materials from international businesses, or attempting to achieve autarky by developing purely domestic substitutes. During the Gulf War, a shortage of advanced ceramic components for Tomahawk missiles occurred. This was caused by a ceramics manufacturer located in the US being pressured by its Japanese parent company, which was in turn pressured by Socialist members of the National Diet to withhold support for the war.

== Arms control ==
Arms control refers to international restrictions upon the development, production, stockpiling, proliferation, and usage of small arms, conventional weapons, and weapons of mass destruction. It is typically exercised through the use of diplomacy, which seeks to persuade governments to accept such limitations through agreements and treaties, although it may also be forced upon non-consenting governments.

=== Notable international arms control treaties ===
- Arms Trade Treaty, concluded in 2013, entered into force on 24 December 2014.
- Biological Weapons Convention, signed in 1972, entered into force during 1975
- Chemical Weapons Convention, signed in 1993, entered into force during 1997
- Geneva Protocol on biological and chemical weapons during 1925
- Missile Technology Control Regime (MTCR), 1987
- Ottawa Treaty on anti-personnel land mines, signed in 1997, entered into force during 1999
- Outer Space Treaty, signed and entered into force during 1967
- New START Treaty, signed by Russia and the United States in April 2010, entered into force in February 2011

== See also ==
Nationally-based defense industry articles

- Defense industry of Brazil
- Defense industry of Croatia
- Defense industry of Finland
- Defense industry of Israel
- Defense industry of North Korea
- Defence industry of Pakistan
- Defence industry of South Africa
- Defense industry of South Korea
- Defense industry of Taiwan
- Defense industry of Ukraine
- Defence industry of Vietnam

Other

- Arms deal (disambiguation)
- Arms embargo
- Arms race
- Arms trafficking
- Guns versus butter model
- History of military technology
- Military Keynesianism
- Offset agreement
- Peace and conflict studies
- Peace dividend
- Permanent war economy
- Private military company
- Productive capacity
- Torture trade
