= Research & Development Establishment (Pakistan) =

Defence Research and Development Institute in Pakistan

Agency overview
- Formed: May 2020
- Preceding agencies: Institute of Optronics; MVRDE; ARDE
- Type: Defense; Optronics; Mobility and Bridging; Simulators; Armament
- Headquarters: Rawalpindi, Pakistan
- Parent department: Ministry of Defence Production
- Website: https://rde.gov.pk

The Directorate-General Research and Development Establishment (reporting name: DGRDE) is a defense agency of the Ministry of Defence Production (MoDP) located in Rawalpindi, Punjab, Pakistan.

Established in 2020 through merger of military-funded research complexes, it focuses on indigenization to support the combat capabilities of the Pakistan Armed Forces and other government civilian agencies as well as supporting the nuclear security enterprise.

== Overview ==
In 2020, the Ministry of Defense Production reorganized and merged the Military Vehicles Research & Development Establishment (established in 1972), Armament Research & Development Establishment (established in 1974), and the military-funded Institute of Optronics (established in 1984) as Directorate-General Research & Development Establishment.

The DGRDE provides combat support capabilities and tactical support to the Pakistani military during combat operations as well as working to deter the external threats. The DGRDE funds the projects that collaborates with academia and private industry to develop equipment, vehicles and technology. This reduces dependence on foreign suppliers and strengthens national security.

== Products and services ==
Products created by RDE include the following:

- UAVs (VTOL Hybrid Surveillance System, Loitering Munition)
- Multi Grenade Launcher (MGL) - 40 MM
- Multi Channel Exploder (MCE)
- RPG-7 Rocket Launcher (Practice rounds, enhanced penetrators)
- Zapping Explosive Reactive Armour (ERA) Kits P-6
- Trailers (Armament, Missile Carrier, Torpedo)
- Blood Bank Refrigerator
- High Altitude Equipment (Thermal Vest and Drawers, Sleeping Bags, Boot Cold Weather)
- Optronics (NVG sights, Short & Medium Range Thermal Weapon Sight)
- Mine Bridging (Mole Plough for tanks)
- Training Simulators
- Design Centre
- Material Testing
