= Torture trade =

Manufacture and export of tools used for torture

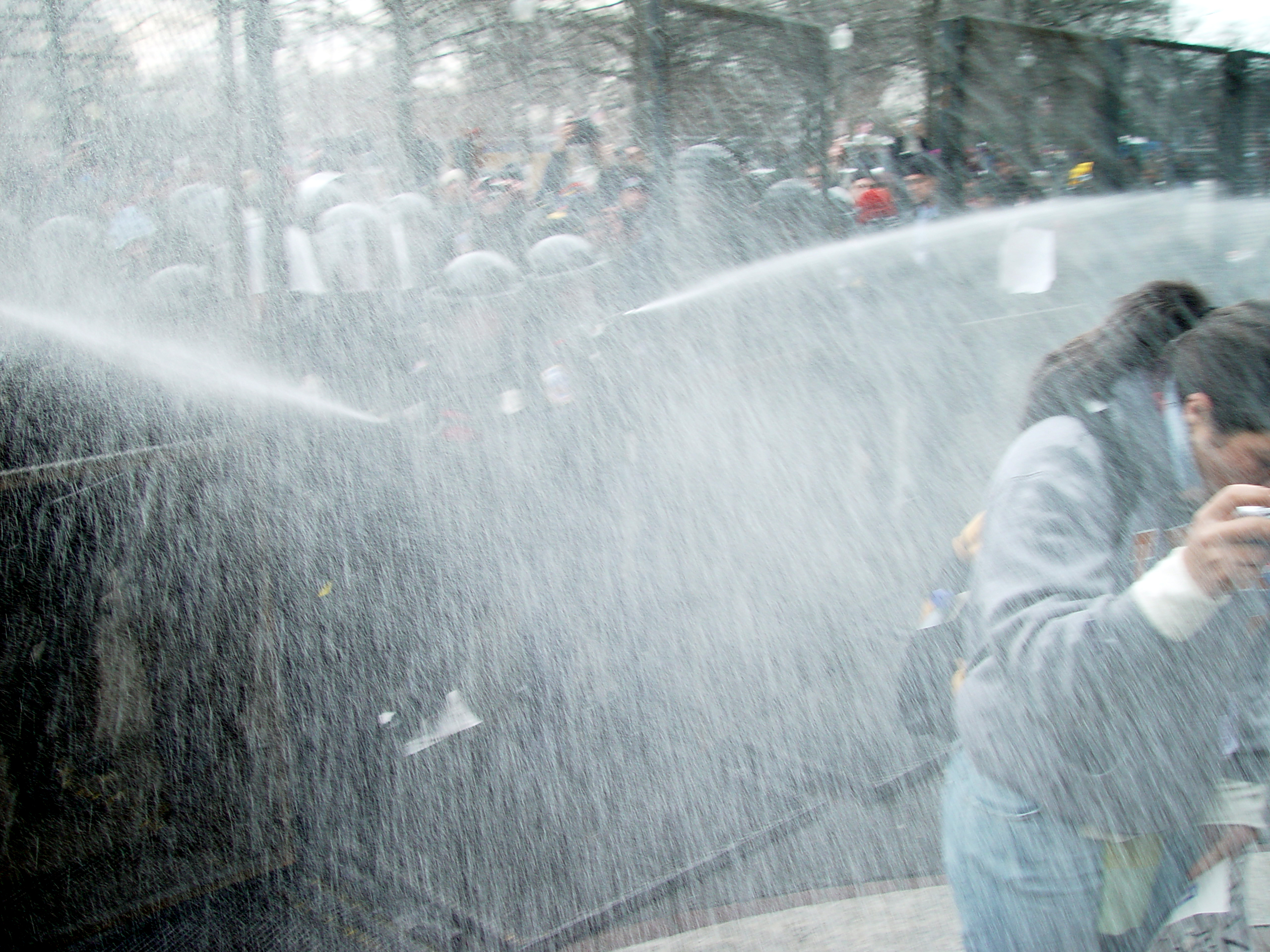
Police pepper spraying protesters at Bush's 2nd inauguration, Washington DC.

The term torture trade refers to the manufacture, marketing, and export of tools commonly used for torture, like restraints and high-voltage electro-shock weapons. In 2001, Amnesty International released a report on "Stopping the Torture Trade".

== Global manufacture ==
High-voltage electro-shock weapons were first developed in the US in the 1990s. They include electro-shock batons, stun guns, stun shields, dart-firing stun guns, and stun belts. From 1997 to 2000, US companies earned over $13 million exporting stun guns, electro-shock batons and optical sighting devices to Eastern Europe and the Middle East. More than 150 companies worldwide are involved in the manufacturing or marketing of torture devices, almost half of which are in the US.

The biggest electro-shock manufacturers are located in the US, mainland China, Taiwan and South Korea. Companies that produce electro-shock weapons, restraints and sprays say their products are nonlethal if used by security officials with proper training. Nonetheless, Amnesty International has documented cases of companies selling stun belts to countries who Amnesty International suspects of committing human rights abuses, like China and Saudi Arabia, without providing training.

The following table includes some of the countries identified by Amnesty International from 1998-2000 as engaged in the manufacture, distribution, supply, or brokerage of stun weapons and restraints.

| Country 1998–2000 | Number of manufacturers, distributors, suppliers, or brokers of stun weapons known to Amnesty International | Number of manufacturers, distributors, suppliers, or brokers of leg irons, shackles or thumbcuffs known to Amnesty International |
|---|---|---|
| Brazil | 3 | |
| China (PRC) | 9 | 1 |
| France | 6 | 1 |
| Germany | 11 | 3 |
| Israel | 6 | |
| Mexico | 2 | |
| Poland | 5 | |
| Russia | 3 | |
| South Korea | 8 | |
| South Africa | 7 | 2 |
| Taiwan (ROC) | 17 | 2 |
| United Kingdom | | 2 |
| USA | 42 | 22 |

== Types of devices ==
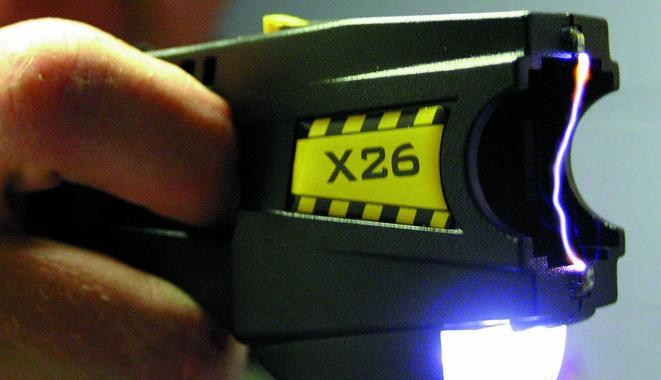
A Stun Gun making an electrical arc between its two electrodes

One type of electro-shock weapon is the remote-controlled stun belt. Stun belts send 50,000 volt shocks through the victim using electrodes placed near the kidneys. The shock causes incapacitation and severe pain. Another type of electric weapons that can be used for torture are stun batons.

Electro-shock weapons are one of the most common tools of torture. Electro-shock weapons are appealing because they leave no mark, although the physical and psychological effects are crippling. Shocks are often applied to sensitive areas like the soles of feet or genitals. Effects include severe pain, loss of muscle control, nausea, convulsions, fainting, and involuntary defecation and urination. Internationally, electro-shock torture is used on children, pregnant women, and other vulnerable populations.

== Opposition campaign ==
Amnesty International has asked companies worldwide to stop the manufacture, marketing, and trade of electro-shock and restraint devices; governments to ban the trade of torture devices; and individuals to write local government representatives and companies asking them to take these steps. The Amnesty International campaign focuses on the trade of restraints, pepper spray (Note: According to Amnesty International, chemical spray was used in large quantities to quell a protest in Lusaka, Zambia in July 1997 and the 1999 WTO riots in Seattle. Amnesty International reported that it had been manufactured by the UK company Pains-Wessex. Subsequently, Amnesty called for an export ban when the receiving regime is either not fully trained in the use of chemical spray, or had shown usage "contrary to the manufacturer’s instructions".) and electroshock weapons.

== Regulations ==
In the European Union, Regulation No. 1236/2005, in effect since 2006, prohibits trade in goods which have no practical use other than torture, and requires licences for the export of goods which could have a use in torture as well as other legitimate uses. Critics say the regulation contains too many loopholes to be effective. Commission Implementing Regulation (EU) No 775/2014 lists prohibited and controlled goods. A proposal for amendments to Council Regulation (EC) No 1236/2005 was put forward by the European Commission on 14 January 2014 and approved by the European Parliament on 30 June 2016. The new regulation will ban the brokering of equipment which is subject to a ban and the supply of technical assistance regarding the supply of banned goods.

The US has also made regulatory changes to limit torture trade. The Department of Commerce created a separate export commodity code for electro-shock devices to make it easier to track them. All companies are now required to have export licenses, although there are still many loopholes. US companies can use drop shipping or paying an intermediary country with loose regulations to export banned goods to the importing country. In 1997, one US company was caught exporting electro-shock guns and pepper spray without a license by mislabeling them as “Fountain pens, Keychains, Child Sound device, [and] Electrical voltage units.”
