= Pakistan Hunting & Sporting Arms Development Company =

Pakistani state-owned arms industry development company

Pakistan Hunting and Sporting Arms Development Company
- Native name: شرکت رترقی ہتھیا شکاری و ورزشی پاکستان
- Type: State-owned, non-profit development company
- Industry: Firearms; Industrial development
- Founded: 2008; 18 years ago in Pakistan
- Defunct: May 2024; 2 years ago (merged into KP-EZDMC)
- Headquarters: Peshawar, Pakistan
- Area served: Pakistan
- Owner: Pakistan Industrial Development Corporation
- Parent: Ministry of Industries and Production
- Website: phsadc.org

Pakistan Hunting and Sporting Arms Development Company (PHSADC) was a Pakistani state-owned, non-profit development company set up by the Ministry of Industries and Production as a subsidiary of the Pakistan Industrial Development Corporation (PIDC) to upgrade and promote Pakistan's hunting and sporting arms manufacturing sector. It was known for its work with gunsmith clusters in Peshawar and the historic arms-making town of Darra Adam Khel in Khyber Pakhtunkhwa, and for organising the periodic Target and Outdoor Shooting Sports (TOSS) exhibitions in Islamabad.

== History ==
PHSADC was incorporated under section 42 of the Companies Ordinance 1984 as part of a broader programme by the Ministry of Industries and Production to set up sector-specific development companies under PIDC for industries judged to have export potential, including jewellery, furniture and hunting and sporting arms. Later, PHSADC began holding its flagship Target and Outdoor Shooting Sport (TOSS) Show in Islamabad.

In 2024, after several years of financial difficulty, PHSADC was formally merged into the provincial-government-owned Khyber Pakhtunkhwa Economic Zones Development and Management Company (KP-EZDMC), where it now operates as a Cluster Development Department.
