= Defence Export Promotion Organization =

Governmental agency in Pakistan

Defence Export Promotion Organization (DEPO)
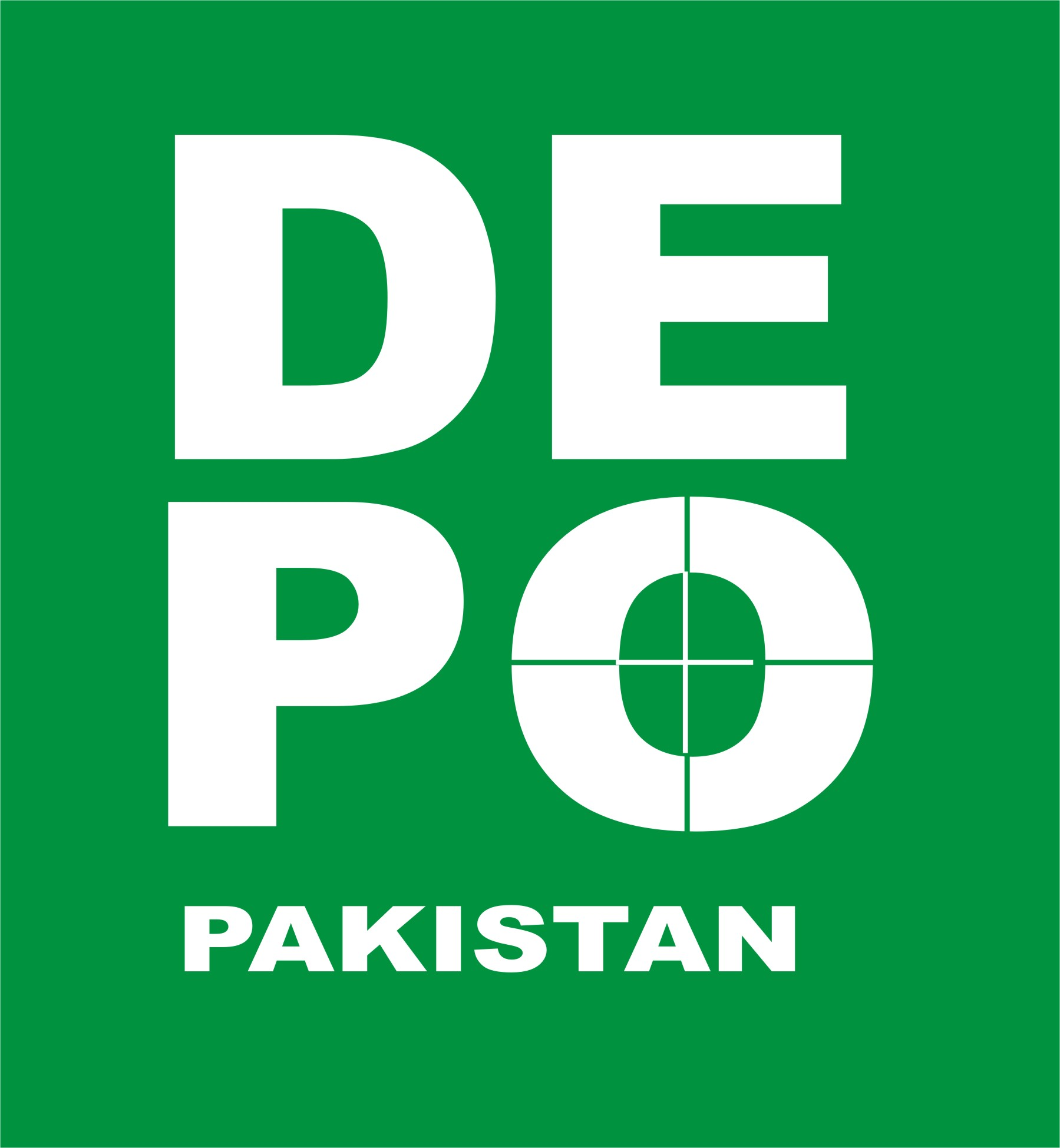

Agency overview
- Jurisdiction: Pakistan
- Headquarters: Islamabad
- Employees: Less than 100
- Agency executive: Major-General Omar Maqbool, HI(M), Director General
- Parent department: Ministry of Defence Production
- Website: Defence Export Promotion Organization (DEPO)

The Defence Export Promotion Organization (DEPO) (Urdu: تنظیم برائے فروغِ صادراتِ دفاعی) is an agency of the Ministry of Defence Production responsible for promoting defence industry exports and fire arms globally.

The DEPO organizes the biennial defence event International Defence Exhibition and Seminar (IDEAS), which takes places at the Karachi Expo Center in Karachi, Pakistan.
