= Integrated Dynamics =

Pakistani Defense Systems Manufacturer

Integrated Dynamics (ID)
- Company type: Private company
- Industry: Aerospace; Defense
- Headquarters: Karachi, Pakistan
- Area served: Worldwide
- Key people: Raja Sabiri Khan (Chief Executive)
- Products: Unmanned aerial vehicles (UAV), Electronics
- Website: www.idaerospace.com

Integrated Dynamics (abbreviated ID) is a private company in Pakistan that designs, manufactures and exports various types of unmanned aerial vehicles (UAV). ID also provides consultancy and turn-key project commissioning for UAV systems.

== Background ==
Integrated Dynamics supplies UAV platforms, flight control systems, C4I systems, data-links, payloads, ground support equipment and other accessories such as auxiliary power units, starters, battery management systems and launch/recovery systems. The company develop UAV models for both civilian and military uses on a 90,000 m² site, claiming to be "one of the largest UAV-dedicated R&D and manufacturing enterprises." ID has exported products to the US, Australia, Spain, South Korea and Libya.

== Law enforcement products ==
=== Border Eagle ===
A low altitude, short range surveillance UAV intended for monitoring national borders, introduced in 2003. Border Eagle Mk II is the latest updated version.

== Military products ==
=== Desert Hawk ===
The Desert Hawk project was started in late 2003 to fulfil a requirement of the Pakistan Army, with the first prototype flying in late 2004. Designed to be capable of unpowered and powered flight using either an internal combustion engine or electric motor, the Desert Hawk looks much like the L-3 Communications-BAI Aerosystems Javelin UAV. Endurance of the Desert Hawk is approximately 2 hours. The standard system comprises a portable ground station and two UAVs. The line-of-sight data-link communication system is designed to get around terrain-masking problems by using one UAV as a communications relay station while the other UAV performs the mission. This capability was demonstrated in 2005 during the flight trials programme. Latest version is the Desert Hawk Mk II.

=== Firefly ===
Integrated Dynamics began development of the Firefly mini-rocket UAV in late 2004 in response to the Pakistan Army operational requirements for a high speed, short range observation system that could be used in the high-altitude environments of northern Pakistan. A basic system costs around $3,000 and comprises four rockets, launcher, carry case, data-link and a PDA-based ground control station.

The Firefly is powered by a commercially available miniature solid fuel rocket motor that gives a flight time of approximately 8 seconds. The UAV can cover 800-1,000 m (2,600–3,300 ft) before disintegrating on impact with the ground. The airframe is constructed from PVC plastic with glass-fibre fins for stabilisation. The payload is a fixed focal-length disposable CCD video camera and a 1.5 GHz L-band data-link. The UAV is launched by a hand-held "gun". Flight testing for the system began in mid-2005 and Firefly sub-systems were being used to support the development of a hand-launched micro-UAV.

The new micro-UAV, based on a 200 mm (8 in) flying wing constructed from vacuum-moulded plastic, was due to start flight-testing in 2006. The micro-UAV is estimated to have a range of 1 km and endurance of approximately 30 minutes.

=== Nishan ===
A high speed aerial target/decoy drone. Latest version is the Nishan Mk II.

=== Tornado ===
A small high speed decoy UAV system powered by a mini-turbojet. Can function as a pre-strike decoy or aerial target and has autonomous navigation capability. Latest version is Tornado Mk 1.

== Exports ==
In late 2006, it was confirmed by ID that a number of Border Eagle Mk II UAVs had been supplied to Libya during the previous 2 years, although the deal may have been limited to airframes only rather than complete systems. According to a statement by the ID Chief Executive, Raja Sabri Khan, the Border Eagle Mk II is one of ID's most popular airframes and approximately 15–20 airframes have been exported to five countries, total value being $300,000.

== See also ==
- Unmanned Aerial Vehicle
- Miniature UAVs

Related lists

- List of unmanned aerial vehicles
