= Dlawer Ala'Aldeen =

President of Middle East Research Institute, MERI

professor Dlawer Ala'Aldeen
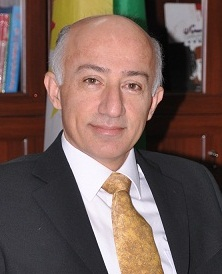

Founding President, The Middle East Research Institute, MERI
- Incumbent
- Assumed office 18 May 2014

Minister of Higher Education and Scientific Research
- In office 28 October 2009 – 5 April 2012
- Prime Minister: Barham Salih
- Preceded by: Idris Hadi
- Succeeded by: Ali Saeed

Professor of Medicine (Clinical Microbiology), University of Nottingham, UK
- In office 1994–2014

Deputy Director, Centre for Infection, Health Protection Agency, Colindale, UK
- In office 2007–2009

Personal details
- Born: 28 November 1960 (age 65) Koy Sanjaq, Erbil, Iraq
- Education: Al-Mustansiriya University; University of LondonRoyal College of Pathologists
- Website: sites.google.com/view/dlawer

Dlawer Ala'Aldeen (Arabic: دلاور عبدالعزیز علاءالدين; born 1960), is the Founding President of the Middle East Research Institute, a policy-research institute, based in Erbil, Kurdistan Region, Iraq. He is a former Minister of Higher Education and Scientific Research in the Kurdistan Regional Government (2009–2012) and former professor of Medicine (Clinical Microbiology & Infectious Disease) at the University of Nottingham in the UK. Book author, opinion leader and lobbyist for human rights, democracy and institution-building. His current focus is on policy research in the fields of good governance, rule of law, national security, governance reform and promotion of human rights.

== Background and career ==
Dlawer Ala'Aldeen was born in the town of Koya (Koy Sanjaq), near Arbil (Erbil), in Iraqi Kurdistan. His father (Abdul-Aziz) was a primary school teacher and author of several books published in Kurdish, including "The Life of Mohammad" and "Exegesis (Tafsir) of Quran".

Ala'Aldeen grew up in and around the city of Arbil, and studied medicine in Baghdad. He immigrated to the United Kingdom in 1984 where he furthered his education and specialised in infectious diseases and clinical microbiology. He studied tropical medicine at the London School of Hygiene & Tropical Medicine and trained for PhD in molecular microbiology at the MRC Clinical Research Centre, Harrow-London, UK. He was awarded Medical Research Council (United Kingdom) Research Fellowship before being appointed as a clinical academic in the Nottingham University Hospitals NHS Trust in 1992 and Professor of clinical microbiology in 2002. He founded the Meningococcal Research Group in 1995, which then expanded into the Molecular Bacteriology and Immunology Group at the University of Nottingham in 1999. He was also the Founding Director of the MSc course in Clinical Microbiology in Nottingham University He was seconded to the Health Protection Agency (later renamed Public Health England and now UK Health Security Agency) as deputy director of the Centre for Infection in Colindale, London. Dlawer was a member of the MRC Infection and Immunity Board and the Specialist Advisory Committee of the Royal College of Pathologists for a number of years. He was appointed as the Royal College's Director of Research in 2009

On 28 October 2009, Ala'Aldeen was sworn in as the Minister of Higher Education and Scientific Research in the 6th Cabinet of the Kurdistan Regional Government, Iraq. After cabinet change on 5 April 2012, he returned to his University position in Nottingham. He later founded a new policy-research institute (The Middle East Research Institute, MERI) in Erbil, Kurdistan Region of Iraq.

== Lobbying for human rights ==
Ala'Aldeen has long lobbied for Kurdish people's human rights and campaigned for a global ban of chemical and biological weapons. His own parents and siblings were among the survivors of the chemical weapons used in Iraq.

He was active in the late 1980s and early 1990s, lobbying within the British Parliament, media, and government. With UK-based colleagues, he founded the Kurdish British Scientific and Medical Support Group (KBSMSG) in 1988, which later became the Kurdish Scientific and Medical Association (KSMA) in 1989. He was elected as the founding Secretary and later the Chairman of KSMA, before the organisation expanded into the Kurdistan Medical and Scientific Federation. He was also an active member of the British academic group, The Working Party on Chemical and Biological weapons between 1988 and 1996.

Ala'Aldeen met Mrs Margaret Thatcher, the former British Prime Minister, and Dr George Carey, the Archbishop of Canterbury, in April 1991 and persuaded them to convince both John Major (then British Prime Minister) and George HW Bush (then President of the USA) to help end Saddam Hussein's attack on the Kurds, protect the fleeing civilians and ensure they return to their homes under international protection. This was in the aftermath of the second Gulf War, when almost two million displaced Kurds fled to the borders with Iran and Turkey. As a consequence of this intervention, a "no-fly zone, Safe Haven" was established in Iraq, north of 36th parallel north that lasted from April 1991 until the fall of Saddam regime. The Safe Haven allowed the Kurds in Iraq to return to their homes, elect their own Kurdistan Parliament and Kurdistan Regional Government. Ala'Aldeen has published a book on 'Lobbying for a Stateless Nation'; and investigated the use of chemical weapons in Kurdistan, and the poisoning of Kurdish refugees in Turkey (published in the Lancet, 1990 Feb 3;335, p. 287-8).

Throughout the 1990s and 2000s, Ala'Aldeen assisted the Kurdistan Government in capacity- and nation-building projects, and supported the institution-building process, particularly in the areas of education, health and institutions of democracy. He also acted as a critical observer, advocating good governance, rule-of-law and democracy in Kurdistan, which were reflected in his extensive publications in local newspapers and international platforms.

== Minister of Higher Education and Scientific Research ==
Ala'Aldeen has long been involved in capacity building for Iraqi and Kurdistan Universities and establishing academic links with British universities. On 28 October 2009, he joined Dr Barham Salih's Cabinet of Kurdistan Regional Government as Minister of Higher Education and Scientific Research.

He initiated a major reform process in the system of Higher Education, with the aim to raise standards and help Universities gain total independence. He led a major and highly transparent scholarship program for sending thousands of students abroad for Masters and PhD studies. His first-year report (A roadmap to quality) in 2010 and a second year report (On route to quality) in 2011 outline the process of reform, including the first introduction of teaching quality assurance in Universities, continuous academic development for teachers, split-site PhD programs, restructuring university management in preparation for independence, introducing electronic system for student applications (Zankoline), converting technical institutes to Polytechnic Universities and modernising postgraduate (specialised) clinical training. He introduced the process of appointing staff on merit via open competition, and took measures to ensure equal opportunity and gender equality in the system of higher education. He submitted two legislative drafts for reforms in higher education and postgraduate clinical training. Ala'Aldeen faced fierce resistance from anti-reformists and interest groups, particularly when he closed down five private dental and pharmacy Colleges in 2010 and four previously licensed private Universities in 2011, for failing to meet quality standards.

== Middle East Research Institute ==
Ala'Aldeen is the Founding President of the Middle East Research Institute (MERI), an independent, grant-funded and non-profit think tank which is focused on policy-issues and governance reform in Iraq, Kurdistan Region and the Levant. MERI became operational on 18 May 2014 and has been ranked the first in Iraq and 23rd in the Middle East and North Africa (among 507 leading institutions, top 5%) according to the Global Go To Think Tank Index report issued by the Think Tanks and Civil Societies Program at the University of Pennsylvania's Lauder Institute.

MERI advances evidence-based policymaking, democratic governance, and sustainable development through research, publication of policy papers, dialogue, and public engagement. MERI also brings together policymakers, diplomats, academics, and civil society leaders to promote informed debate and practical policy solutions for the region's most pressing challenges.

Ala'Aldeen and colleagues have published numerous policy papers and reports on geopolitical developments, migration of refugees, Internally Displace persons (IDPs), security dynamics in the Middle East, EU policies in the Region, post-ISIS Iraq, conflict resolution (e.g. the future of Kirkuk), prevention of violent extremism, promoting human rights (protecting minority's rights, prevention of violence against women) and state-building and institutional reform (Judiciary system, public prosecution, interior ministry and Ministry of Peshmarga).

== Scientific work & leadership in Medicine ==
From 1988 to 2014, Ala'Aldeen has worked on pathogenesis, molecular epidemiology and vaccine development of various bacterial pathogens, particularly Neisseria meningitidis (causes meningitis and sepsis) and Campylobacter jejuni (most common cause of food poisoning). He and his research group discovered a number of bacterial virulence factors and identified their human target receptors. These virulence factors have been investigated for their vaccine potential. They have also studied the human genetic response to bacteria as well as the population genetics and genome evolution of N. meningitidis, Staphylococcus aureus and Pseudomonas aeruginosa.

Ala'Aldeen has published extensively in international scientific journals and co-authored several books in microbiology, such as Staphylococcus Aureus: molecular and clinical aspects; Molecular and Clinical Aspects of Bacterial Vaccine Development; and Medical Microbiology. He also holds numerous patents for anti-Campylobacter agents and meningococcal vaccine candidates.

He was chairman or member of a number of prestigious National learned societies and committees in the United Kingdom, which included:

- Editorial board of three international microbiology/infection journals: Journal of Medical Microbiology, Journal of Infection, BMC Microbiology.
- Director of Research, Royal College of Pathologists (2009–10)
- Chairman, RCP/RCPath Infection Research Subcommittee (2007–09).
- Chairman, Clinical Microbiology Group of the Society for General Microbiology (2005–2009)
- Chairman, Federation of Infection Societies Scientific Committee (2007)
- Examination Board of the Royal College of Pathologists (2005–10)
- Medical Research Council's Infection and Immunity Board (2007–2010)
- Specialty Advisory Committee of the Royal College of Pathologists (RCPath) (2006–10)
- Health Protection Agency's Meningococcus Forum (1998–2010)

== Writer ==
As a writer on policies and current affairs, Ala'Aldeen has published numerous articles on the impact of global politics on Kurdistan and on strategic issues relating to Kurdish human rights, governance, institutionalisation, rule-of-law, health and higher education He has published several books on politics and governance including: "Lobbying for a Stateless Nation" (2007); "Nation Building and the system of self-governance in Kurdistan Region" (2013); and "State-Building: A roadmap for the rule of law and institutionalisation in Kurdistan Region" (2018). He comments regularly on local, regional, and international news channels offering his insight and analysis on current Kurdish, Iraqi, and Middle Eastern issues. Finally, Ala'Aldeen has a special interest in genealogy and has published a book on his family tree and history of his ancestors: The Heritage of Aziz and Nasreen, A History of The Ahmedi Malazada Family (London, 2021).
