= Middle East Research Institute =

Iraq-based think tank

Middle East Research Institute (MERI)
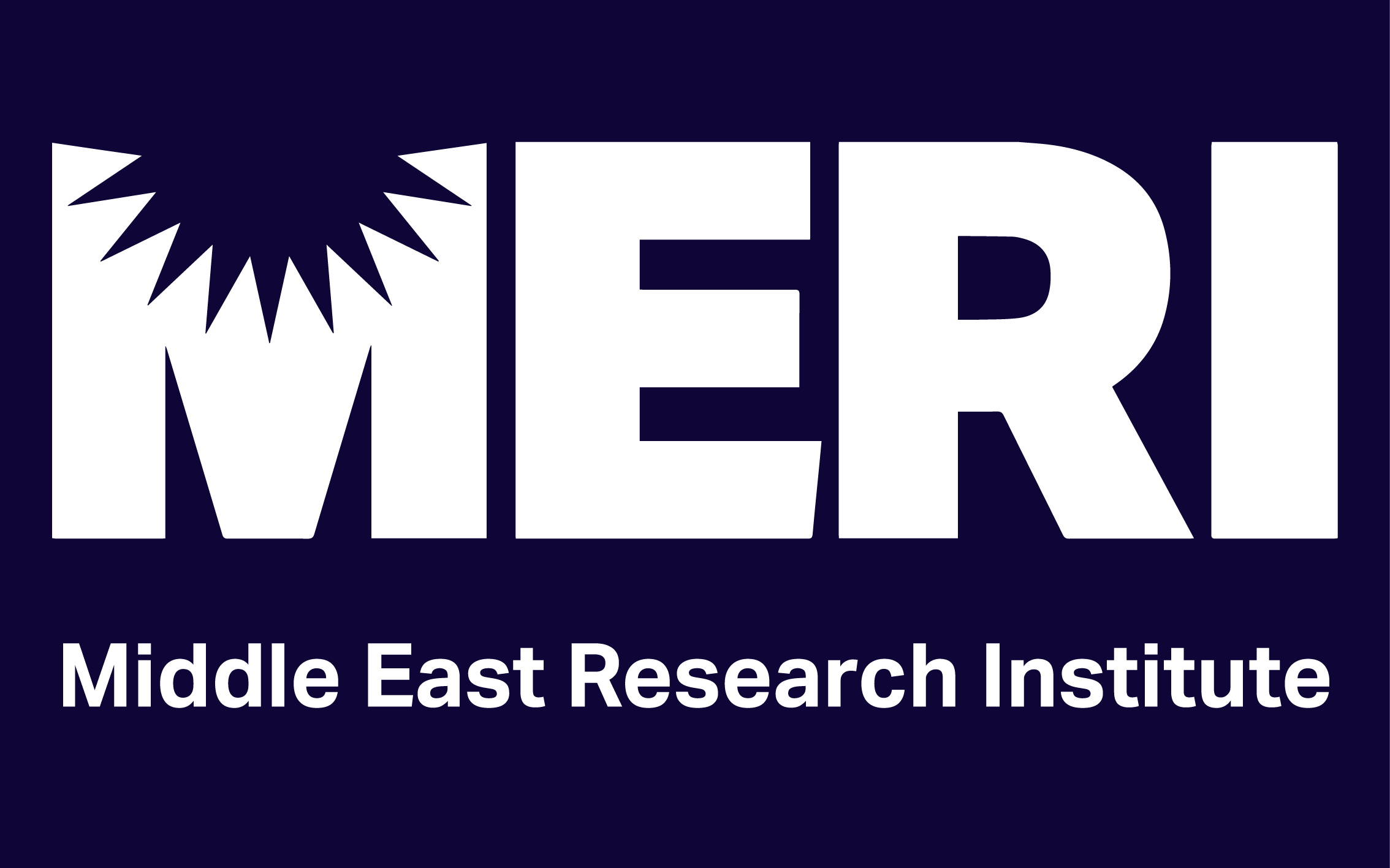
- Abbreviation: MERI
- Established: 2014
- Type: Policy Research & Think tank
- Headquarters: Erbil, Kurdistan Region of Iraq
- Region served: Middle East
- President: Dlawer Ala'Aldeen
- Revenue: Grant Funded
- Website: meri-k.org

The Middle East Research Institute (MERI) (Kurdish: ئینستیتیوتی رۆژهەڵاتی ناوەڕاست بۆ توێژینەوە; Arabic: مؤسسة الشرق الأوسط للبحوث) is an academic policy-research institute and think tank based in Erbil in the Kurdistan Region of Iraq. MERI carries out fundamental research in areas of peace, human rights, governance, security and economy. Founded in 2014, the organisation has grown rapidly and now occupies an important niche in the field of policy research in the Middle East. MERI has been ranked by Think Tanks and Civil Societies Program of University of Pennsylvania as Iraq's leading policy research organisation for the past three years in a run and No. 34 in the Middle East and North Africa.

== Mission ==
MERI's mission is to contribute to the process of nation-building, state-building and democratisation in the Middle East and its objectives are to promote and develop human rights, democracy, good governance and economic prosperity [1]. MERI's remit includes a broad range of activities, including, international Politics, National Security, institutions of Democracy and Governance, Economics, Energy, Environment, Public Services, Civil Society and Cultural Development.

== Research activities ==
MERI publishes its findings and conduct its policy debates in three languages, including English, Arabic and Kurdish. The institute has conducted numerous research projects and published quality reports on ISIL, internally displaced persons (IDPs), refugees and minority rights, post-war reconciliation, governance system reforms, promoting human rights (protecting minority's rights, prevention of violence against women) and institutional reform (Judiciary system, public prosecution, interior ministry and Ministry of Peshmarga)

MERI collaborates widely with universities and peace organisations in the United States, Europe and the Middle East.

== MERI Forum ==
MERI also organises high-profile annual conferences (MERI Forum) where political leaders and policy experts in Iraq and neighbouring countries attend. MERI held its inaugural Forum (MERI Forum 2014) between 4–6 November 2014. This was considered a first in the region, as it included open debates between Fuad Masum (President of Iraq), Salim al-Jabouri (Speaker of Iraqi Parliament), Osama al-Nujaifi (Vice President of Iraq), Nechirvan Barzani (former Prime Minister, now President of KRI), Barham Salih (former Prime Minister of KRG - later became President of Iraq), Masrour Barzani (current Prime Minister of KRG), Qubad Talabani (Deputy PM of KRG) as well as international policy makers, such as Foreign Ministers (e.g. Turkey), ambassadors and academic experts. The MERI Forum has been conducted annually since, and its impact has been significant on policy-making and public awareness.

== Iraq Forum ==
MERI organised the first (inaugural) Iraq Forum in Baghdad (2-4 May 2023), in partnership with Al-Nahrain Centre. This was yet another high-profile conferences that brought together decision- and policy-makers as well as national and international academics, diplomats and journalists. The conference was attended by Prime Minister MS Al-Sudani, KRI President Nechirvan Barzani, Deputy Prime Ministers of GoI and KRG, A/S of State Barbara Leaf, SRSG Jeanine Plasschaert and several Cabinet Ministers and political leaders.

== Funding ==
MERI is entirely grant-funded, hence its financial and political independence. MERI's one-off seed capital ($3.5 million) was awarded in December 2013 by the Kurdistan Region's Oil and Gas Council (Capacity Building Funds). It has since competed successfully for research funds internationally. It has been awarded major grants from the European Union under the Horizon 2020 program, including the EUNPACK and FEUTURE. It has also secured funding from the United States Institute of Peace.

== Reception ==
MERI became operational on 18 May 2014. In 2015, only one year after its establishment, MERI was named among the top think tanks in the Middle East and Northern Africa (MENA) Region, and the highest ranking in Iraq. MERI consolidated its position for successive years (2015-2019) and ranked the first in Iraq and 34th in MENA countries (among 507 institutions, top 7%) according to the Global Go To Think Tank Index report issued by the Think Tanks and Civil Societies Program at the University of Pennsylvania’s Lauder Institute.

MERI's publications or quotes from its scholars have been extensively cited in major news and media outlets, including The New York Times, the Voice of America, the Australian RN-ABC, NBC News, Aljazeera, Washington Post, the Economist and others
