= Stockholm International Peace Research Institute =

Research institute in Stockholm, Sweden

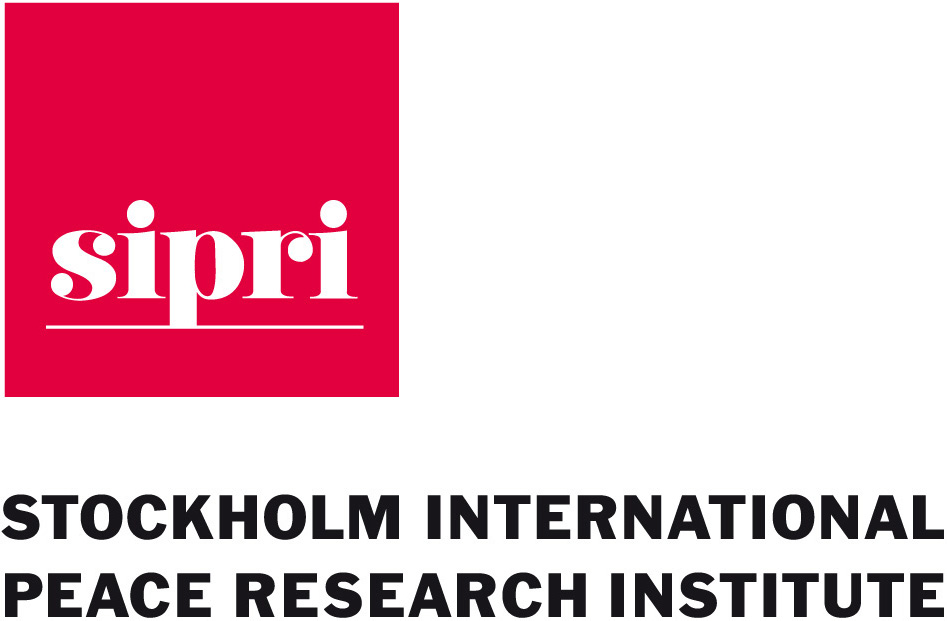
- Abbreviation: SIPRI
- Formation: 1966
- Founders: Tage Erlander, Alva Myrdal
- Headquarters: Solna
- Location: Stockholm, Sweden
- Chair: Stefan Löfven
- Director: Karim Haggag
- Website: www.sipri.org

Stockholm International Peace Research Institute (SIPRI) is an international institute based in Stockholm, Sweden. It was founded in 1966 and provides data, analysis and recommendations for armed conflict, military expenditure and arms trade as well as disarmament and arms control. The research is based on open sources and is directed to decision-makers, researchers, media and the interested public.

SIPRI's organizational purpose is to conduct scientific research in issues on conflict and cooperation of importance for international peace and security, with the goal of contributing to an understanding for the conditions for a peaceful solution of international conflicts and sustainable peace.

SIPRI was ranked among the top three non-US world-wide think tanks in 2014 by the University of Pennsylvania Lauder Institute's Global Go To Think Tanks Report. In 2020, SIPRI ranked 34th amongst think tanks globally. As of August 2026, SIPRI is the most cited think tank based outside of the US and UK and eleventh-most cited think tank overall.

== History ==
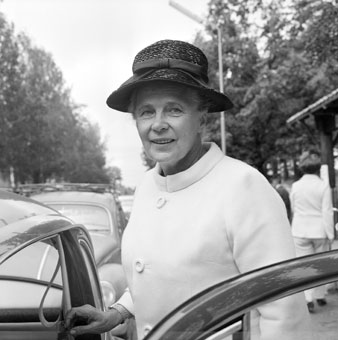
Ambassador Alva Myrdal

In 1964, Prime Minister of Sweden Tage Erlander put forward the idea of establishing a peace research institute to commemorate Sweden's 150 years of unbroken peace.

A Swedish Royal Commission chaired by Ambassador Alva Myrdal proposed in its 1966 report to establish an institute, later named the Stockholm International Peace Research Institute, SIPRI. The institute's research should seek to contribute to "the understanding of the preconditions for a stable peace and for peaceful solutions of international conflicts" and the Commission recommended that research be concentrated on armaments, their limitation and reduction, and arms control. The commission also recommended that SIPRI work is of "an applied research character directed towards practical-political questions [which] should be carried on in a constant interchange with research of a more theoretical kind".

SIPRI renders accessible, impartial, information on weapon developments, arms transfers and production, military expenditure, as well as on arms limitations, reductions and disarmament. The task of the institute is to conduct "scientific research on questions of conflict and cooperation of importance for international peace and security with the aim of contributing to an understanding of the conditions for peaceful solution of international conflicts and for a stable peace".

The Swedish Riksdag decided that the Institute be established on 1 July 1966 with the legal status of an independent foundation.

== Organisation ==
SIPRI's organisation consists of a governing board, director, deputy director, research staff collegium and support staff. The governing board takes decisions on important matters concerning the research agenda, activities, organisation and financial administration of the institute. Other matters are decided by the director. The research staff collegium advises the Director on research matters.

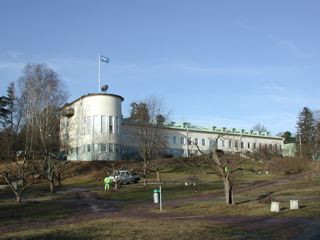
SIPRI headquarters in Solna, Stockholm

The staff of 84 employees is mainly international, with a representation of 27 different nationalities reported in 2021. The researchers are recruited for specific project periods and represent various academic disciplines. SIPRI also hosts guest researchers who work on issues related to research programmes as well as interns in relevant fields whose programmes of study can contribute to and benefit from SIPRI's research.

The institute works in a global network, with partnerships and cooperation between other institutes and with individual scientists. SIPRI has close cooperation with many multilateral organisations, for example, the United Nations and the European Union. SIPRI is frequently visited by government delegations, parliamentarians as well as researchers from the academic sphere. The institute keeps close connections with the diplomatic body in Stockholm.

=== Governing board ===
Members of the Governing Board (as of 2026):

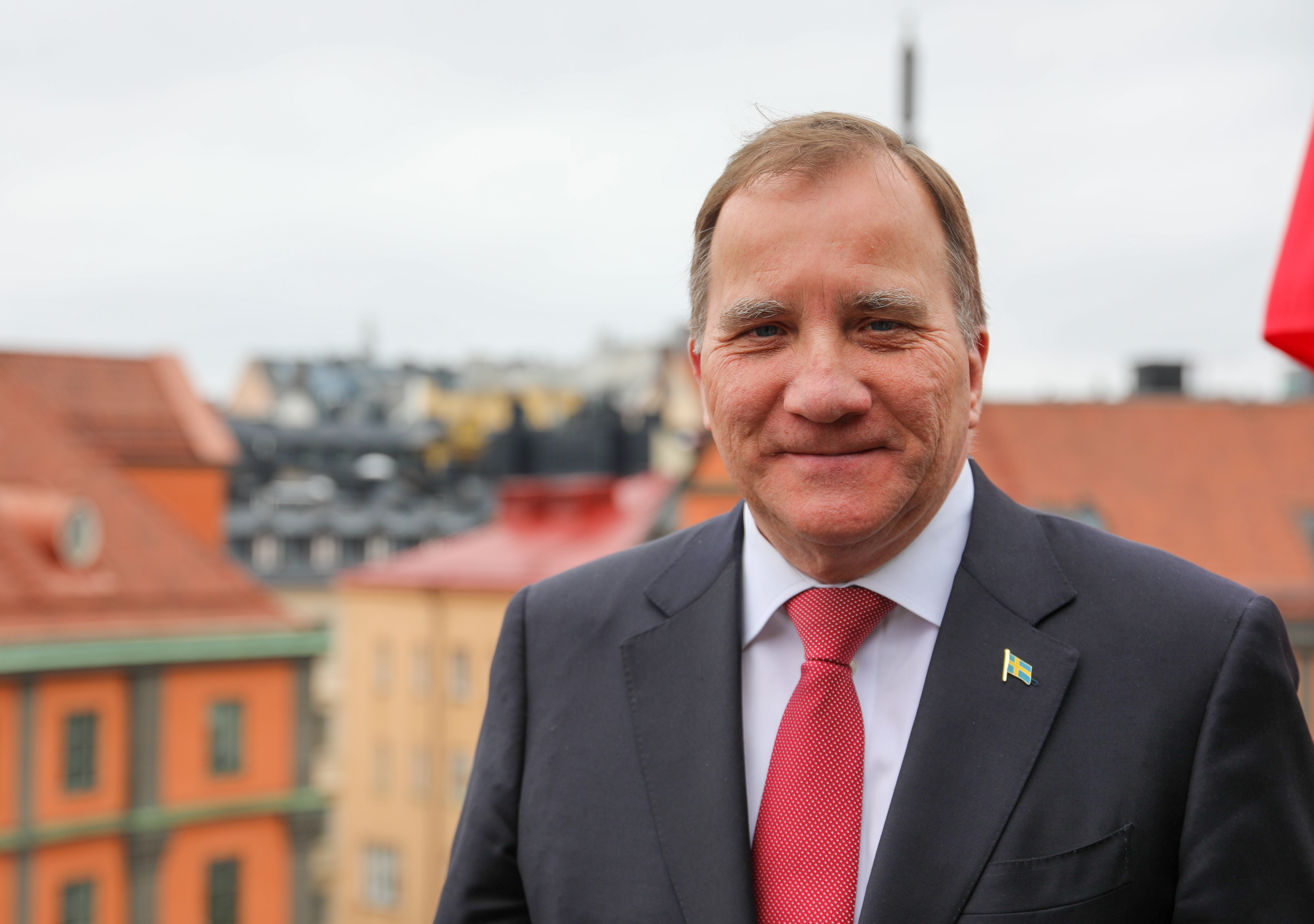
Stefan Löfven, Chair of SIPRI Governing Board

- Stefan Löfven (Sweden), former Prime Minister of Sweden, as of 1 June 2022, Chair of the SIPRI Governing Board
- Dr Mohamed Ibn Chambas (Ghana), former Special Representative of the United Nations Secretary-General for West Africa and Head of the UN Office for West Africa (UNOWAS)
- Zeid Ra’ad Al Hussein (Jordan), President and CEO of the International Peace Institute and Perry World House Professor of the Practice of Law and Human Rights at the University of Pennsylvania
- Noha El-Mikawy (Egypt), Dean, School of Global Affairs and Public Policy (GAPP)
- Jean-Marie Guéhenno (France), Senior Advisor, Centre for Humanitarian Dialogue and a member of the UN Secretary General High-Level Advisory Board on Mediation
- Nathalie Tocci (Italy), Professor of the Practice at Johns Hopkins School of Advanced International Studies and Senior Fellow at the Institute for European Policymaking at Bocconi University
- Patricia Lewis (United Kingdom/Ireland), Research Director, International Security at Chatham House
- Brian A. Wong (United States), Managing Director of the Aspen China Fellowship Program, Managing Director of Seacliff Partners Limited and Founder and CEO of RADII Media

Former Governing Board Chairpersons:

- Alva Myrdal (1966–67)
- Gunnar Myrdal (1967–73)
- Rolf Edberg (1974–78)
- Hans Blix (1978)
- Karin Söder (1978–79)
- Rolf Björnerstedt (1979–85)
- Ernst Michanek (1985–87)
- Inga Thorsson (1987–91)
- Daniel Tarschys (1992–2000)
- Rolf Ekeus (2000–10)
- Göran Lennmarker (2010–14)
- Sven-Olof Petersson (diplomat) (2014–2017)
- Jan Eliasson (2017–2022)

Former board members include:

- Dan Smith (United Kingdom), Director, SIPRI

=== Director ===
The Director, who is appointed by the Swedish Government, has the main responsibility for SIPRI's work programme. Dr Bates Gill served as SIPRI Director from 2007 to 2012. In September 2012, the Swedish Government appointed the German economist Tilman Brück as his successor. Brück held the position of SIPRI Director from January 2013 to June 2014. In June 2014 the SIPRI Governing Board appointed Dr Ian Anthony as Director for an interim period. The current Director, Karim Haggag, was appointed in September 2025.

Former SIPRI Directors:

- Robert Neild (United Kingdom, 1967–71)
- Frank Barnaby (United Kingdom, 1971–81)
- Frank Blackaby (United Kingdom, 1981–86)
- Walther Stützle (Germany, 1986–91)
- Adam Daniel Rotfeld (Poland, 1991–2002)
- Alyson Bailes (United Kingdom, 2002–07)
- Bates Gill (United States, 2007–12)
- Tilman Brück (Germany, 2013–14)
- Ian Anthony (United Kingdom, interim 2014–15)
- Dan Smith (United Kingdom, 2015–25)

== Research ==
Research is conducted at SIPRI by an international staff of about 46 researchers and research assistants. The institute's current research programme centres on the following major themes:

- Armament and Disarmament
- Conflict, Peace and Security
- Peace and Development

With the following research areas:

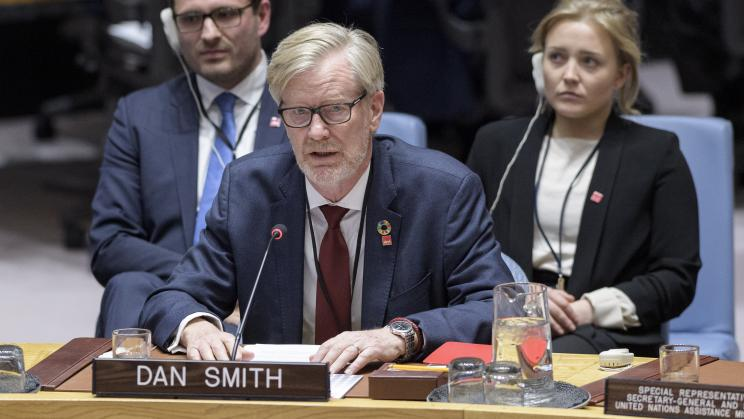
SIPRI Director Dan Smith briefs the UN Security Council on climate-related security risks in Somalia.

- Arms and Military Expenditure
- Chemical and biological weapons
- Dual-use and Arms Trade Control
- Emerging Military and Security Technologies
- EU Non-Proliferation and Disarmament Consortium
- Weapons of mass destruction
- Nuclear disarmament, Arms Control and Non-proliferation
- Africa
- Asia
- Europe
- Middle East and North Africa
- Peace Operations and Conflict Management
- Climate Change and Risk
- Environment of Peace
- Food, peace and security
- Governance and Society
- Peacebuilding and Resilience

=== Publications and information ===
SIPRI's publications and information material are distributed to a wide range of policy makers, researchers, journalists, organisations and the interested public. The results of the research are disseminated through the publication of books and reports by SIPRI and commissioned authors as well as through symposia and seminars. The institute has forged its profile by concentrating on present-day realities, providing unbiased facts to states and individuals.

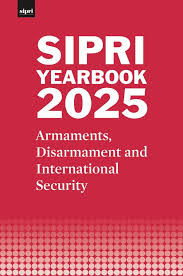
SIPRI Yearbook 2025

SIPRI's main publication, the SIPRI Yearbook, was first published on 12 November 1969. The Yearbook serves as a single authoritative and independent source to which politicians, diplomats and journalists can turn for an account of what has happened during the past year in armaments and arms control, armed conflicts and conflict resolution, security arrangements and disarmament. It is translated into a number of other languages, notably Arabic, Chinese, Russian and Ukrainian. The summary of the SIPRI Yearbook is available in several languages, including Catalan, Dutch, French, Italian, Korean, Persian, Spanish and Swedish.

SIPRI series:

- SIPRI Yearbook: Armaments, Disarmament and International Security
- SIPRI Yearbook summary Yearbook in English and a number of other languages
- Oxford University Press publications
- SIPRI research papers and reports
- SIPRI policy briefs, papers and reports
- SIPRI fact sheets and background papers
- SIPRI databases

=== SIPRI Databases ===
SIPRI's research projects maintain large databases on military expenditure, arms-producing industries, arms transfers, chemical and biological warfare, national and international export controls, arms control agreements, annual chronologies of major arms control events, military manoeuvres and nuclear explosions.

==== SIPRI Arms Transfers Database ====
Showing all international transfers of major conventional arms since 1950

===== Trend-indicator value =====
To quantify the volume of weapons as a single number, SIPRI has developed so-called trend-indicator value (TIV). It is a measure of major conventional weapons delivery volume in terms of its military capability, rather than its price.

==== SIPRI Mapping ATT-Relevant Cooperation and Assistance Activities Database ====
The SIPRI Mapping ATT-relevant Cooperation and Assistance Activities Database covers cooperation and assistance activities in regards to arms transfer and small arms and light weapons (SALW) controls since 2012. The database supports state's implementation of two treaties – the 2001 UN Programme of Action on SALW and the 2013 Arms Trade Treaty.

==== SIPRI Arms Industry Database ====
The SIPRI Arms Industry Database reports on the top 100 largest arms-producing and military services companies.

==== SIPRI Multilateral Peace Operations Database ====
This database contains data on personnel, country contributions, fatalities and budgets for all multilateral peace operations from the year 2000 and onwards.

==== SIPRI Military Expenditure Database ====
The Military Expenditure Database reports on the annual military spending of most countries around the world.

== Events and conferences ==
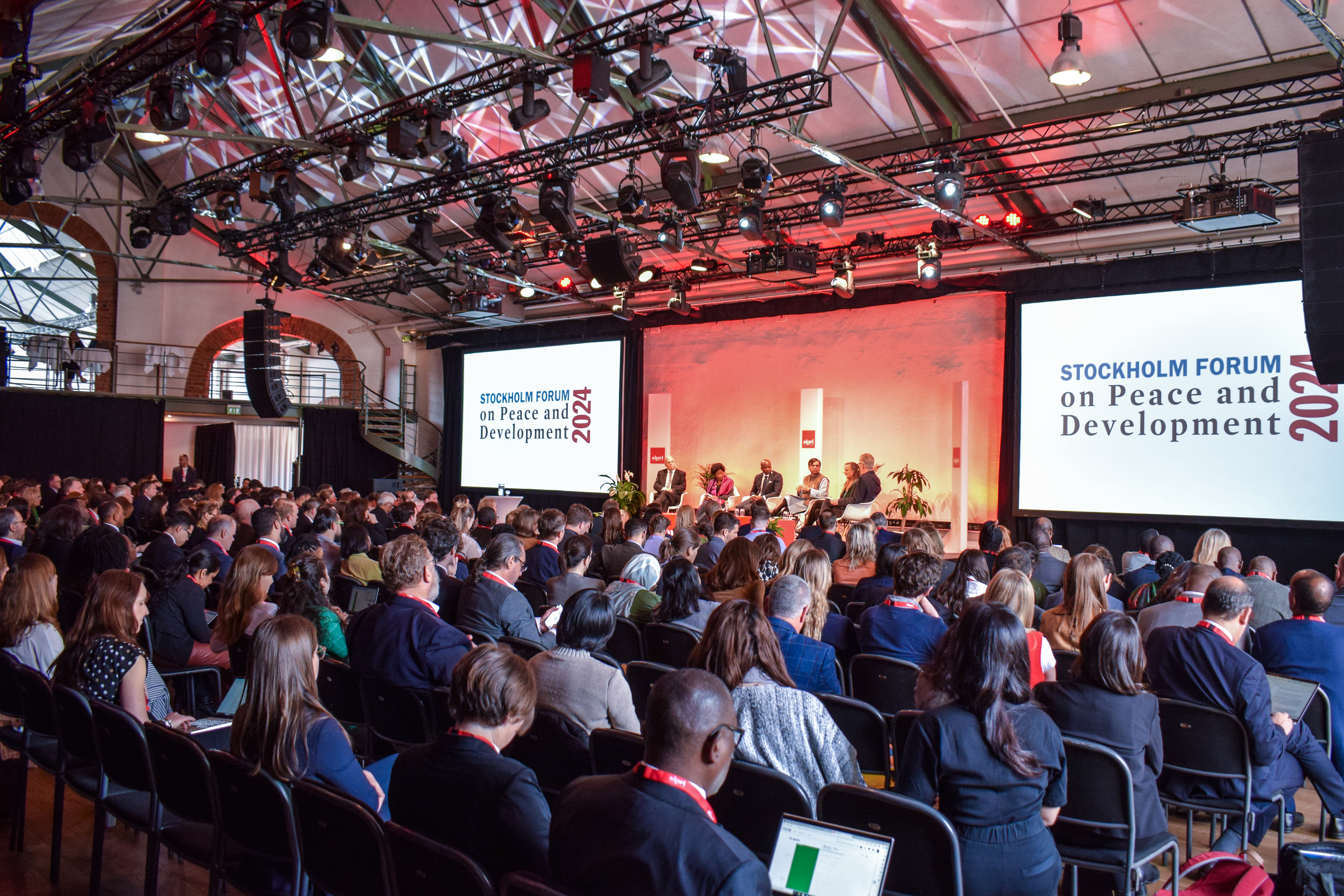
2024 Stockholm Forum on Peace and Development

Within the fields of study, SIPRI arranges numerous workshops, conferences, seminars and lectures, bringing together an all-encompassing spectrum of expertise to exchange views on relevant themes. Among these events, the largest are the Stockholm Forum on Peace and Development, the Stockholm Security Conference and SIPRI Lecture.

In 2025, the Stockholm Forum on Peace and Development was held in a hybrid format, featuring a diverse range of sessions, including high-level policy debates, roundtables, workshops and fireside chats on the theme of 'The Future of Conflict Resolution and Peacebuilding'. The 2024 Stockholm Security Conference was held on the topic of 'Deterrence. Securing Europe, Managing the Dangers' and gathered over 100 global participants across thought-provoking panels. A 2022 SIPRI event held on the theme of 'Environment of Peace' was delivered by HE Helen Clark, former Prime Minister of New Zealand and Administrator of the United Nations Development Programme.

== Finances ==
SIPRI's financial support is primarily drawn from governments and independent philanthropic organisations around the world. SIPRI also receives annual support from the Swedish government in the form of a core grant approved by the Swedish parliament.

== See also ==
=== Peace research institutes ===
- Bonn International Centre for Conflict Studies
- Geneva International Peace Research Institute
- Journal of Peace Research
- Peace Research Institute Frankfurt
- Peace Research Institute Oslo
- Tami Steinmetz Center for Peace Research

=== Military budgets ===
- List of countries by military expenditures
- United Nations Security Council:
- Military budget of China
- Military budget of India
- Military budget of Russia
- Military budget of the United States
