= Military budget of the United States =

Military budget of China, USSR, Russia and US in constant 2022 US$ billions

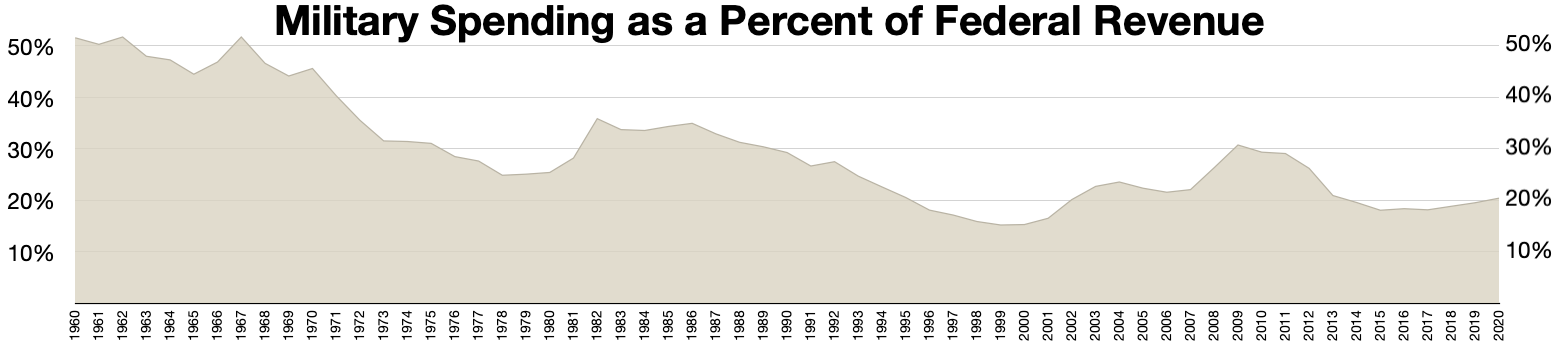
Military spending as a percent of federal government revenue

The military budget of the United States is the largest portion of the discretionary federal budget allocated to the Department of Defense (DoD), or more broadly, the portion of the budget that goes to any military-related expenditures. It pays the salaries, training, and health care of uniformed and civilian personnel, maintains arms, equipment and facilities, funds operations, and develops and buys new items. The budget funds the six branches of the US military: the Army, Navy, Marine Corps, Coast Guard, Air Force, and Space Force. Critics contend that recent U.S. defense budgets have disproportionately invested in long-term developmental programs instead of producing weapons systems needed in the near term.

== Budget for FY2026 ==
Initially, the U.S. Department of Defense's (DoD) fiscal year 2026 (FY2026) budget request was $892.6 billion, maintaining near-flat nominal growth compared to FY2025 levels.

However, on 11 June 2025, the House Armed Services Committee advanced the FY2026 National Defense Authorization Act (NDAA), proposing a total authorization of $925 billion, including $878.7 billion specifically for the Department of Defense. Debate in Congress focused on aligning resources to counter rising threats, particularly in the Indo-Pacific region, while balancing domestic fiscal pressures.

In the end, the overall budget requested by the US military department was $961.6 billion, which included $197.4 billion for the Department of the Army, $292.2 billion for the Department of the Navy, $301.1 billion for the Department of the Air Force and $170.9 billion for defense-wide expenditure.

Share of Military services in the FY2026 budget
(values in $billion)
1. United States Army 176.8 (18.4%)
2. United States Navy 235 (24.4%)
3. United States Air Force 195.9 (20.4%)
4. United States Marine Corps 57.3 (5.96%)
5. United States Space Force 39.9 (4.15%)
6. USSOCOM 14.7 (1.53%)
7. National Guard 34.3 (3.57%)
8. Defense Health Agency 42.9 (4.46%)
9. Missile Defense Agency 13.2 (1.37%)
10. Air Force (Non Blue) 51.5 (5.36%)
11. Miscellaneous and classified 100.1 (10.4%)

=== FY2027 budget proposal ===
In 2026, the Trump administration put forward a proposed United States defense budget for fiscal year 2027 of around $1.5 trillion, marking a noticeable increase compared to previous years. According to official budget documents and reporting by major news outlets, the plan includes expanded funding for naval construction, missile defense systems, artificial intelligence integration, and other advanced military technologies as part of a wider effort to modernize the U.S. armed forces. The proposal has been described as one of the largest defense budget requests in modern U.S. history, with estimates suggesting an increase of roughly 40 percent compared to the previous fiscal year. Analysts say the request reflects a focus on strengthening military capabilities and expanding the defense industrial base amid rising geopolitical tensions. U.S. national security appropriations documents indicate that defense spending also includes security assistance to allies such as Israel within broader congressional funding frameworks.

Share of Military departments in the FY2026 budget
(values in $billion)
1. Department of the Army 197.4 (20.5%)
2. Department of the Navy 292.2 (30.4%)
3. Department of the Air Force 301.1 (31.3%)
4. Defense-wide 170.9 (17.8%)

== Budget for FY2025 ==
As of 11 March 2024 the US Department of Defense fiscal year 2025 (FY2025) budget request was $849.8 billion. (Note: FY2025) On 20 December 2024 the House approved a Continuing Resolution to fund DoD and DoE operations at the FY2024 levels until 14 March 2025, at which time the Appropriations process for the NDAA is to be revisited by the 119th Congress. On 21 December 2024 the Senate approved the Continuing Resolution for President Biden's signature into law.

== Budget for FY2024 ==
As of 10 March 2023 the fiscal year 2024 (FY2024) presidential budget request was $842 billion. (Note: FY2024 agreement was reached Saturday 27 May 2023. The Senate agreed to the debt ceiling arrangement for 2023-2025 on 2 June 2023.) In January 2023 Treasury Secretary Janet Yellen announced the US government would hit its $31.4 trillion debt ceiling on 19 January 2023; the date on which the US government would no longer be able to use extraordinary measures such as issuance of Treasury securities is estimated to be in June 2023. On 3 June 2023, the debt ceiling was suspended until 2025. The $886 billion National Defense Authorization Act is facing reconciliation of the House and Senate bills after passing both houses 27 July 2023; the conferees have to be chosen, next. As of September 2023, a continuing resolution is needed to prevent a government shutdown. A shutdown was avoided on 30 September for 45 days (until 17 November 2023), with passage of the NDAA on 14 December 2023. The Senate will next undertake negotiations on supplemental spending for 2024. A government shutdown was averted on 23 March 2024 with the signing of a $1.2 trillion bill to cover FY2024.

== Budget for FY2023 ==
As of March 2022, the defense department was operating under a continuing resolution, which constrains spending even though DoD has to respond to world events, such as the 2022 Russian invasion of Ukraine; the FY2023 defense budget request will exceed $773 billion, according to the chairman of the House Armed Services Committee. By 9 March 2022 a bipartisan agreement on a $782 billion defense budget had been reached (as part of an overall $1.5 trillion budget for FY2022 – thus avoiding a government shutdown).

As of 4 April 2022 the FY2023 presidential budget request of $773 billion included $177.5 billion for the Army, $194 billion for the Air Force and Space Force, and $230.8 billion for the Navy and Marine Corps (up 4.1% from the FY2022 request). As of 12 December 2022 the House and Senate versions of the FY2023 National Defense Authorization Act (FY2023 NDAA) were to be $839 billion, and $847 billion, for the HASC, and SASC respectively, for a compromise $857.9 billion top line. By 16 December 2022 the current budget extension resolution will have expired. The President signed the FY2023 Appropriations bill on 23 December 2022.

US military spending in 2021 reached $801 billion per year according to the Stockholm International Peace Research Institute.

== Budget for FY2022 ==
In May 2021, the President's defense budget request for FY2022 was $715 billion, up $10 billion from the $705 billion FY2021 request. The total FY2022 defense budget request, including the Department of Energy, was $753 billion, up $12 billion from FY2021's request. On 22 July 2021 the Senate Armed Services Committee approved a budget $25 billion greater than the President's request. The National Defense Authorization Act, budgeting $740 billion for defense, was signed 27 December 2021.

By military department, the Army's portion of the budget request, $173 billion, dropped $3.6 billion from the enacted FY2021 budget; the Department of the Navy's portion of the budget request, $211.7 billion, rose 1.8% from the enacted FY2021 budget, largely due to a 6% increase for the Marine Corps' restructuring into a littoral combat force (Navy request: $163.9 billion, or just 0.6% over FY2021, Marine Corps request: $47.9 billion, a 6.2% increase over FY2021); the Air Force's $156.3 billion request for FY2022 is a 2.3% increase over FY2021 enacted budget; the Space Force budget of $17.4 billion is a 13.1% increase over FY2021 enacted budget. Overseas contingency operations (OCOs) are now replaced by "direct war and enduring costs", which are now migrated into the budget. After the release of the FY2022 budget requests to Congress, the military departments also posted their Unfunded priorities/requirements lists for the Congressional Armed Services Committees.

== Budget for FY2021 ==
For FY2021, the Department of Defense's discretionary budget authority was approximately $705.39 billion ($705,390,000,000). Mandatory spending of $10.77 billion, the Department of Energy and defense-related spending of $37.335 billion added up to the total FY2021 Defense budget of $753.5 billion. FY2021 was the last year for OCOs as shown by the troop withdrawal from Afghanistan. Research, Development, Test, and Evaluation (RDT&E) investments for the future are offset by the OCO cuts, and by reduced procurement of legacy materiel.

=== Budget summary for FY2021 with projections for FY2022–2025 ===
(Expenditures listed in millions of dollars)

Function and subfunction	FY2019 total	FY2020				FY2021			FY2022 total	FY2023 total	FY2024 total	FY2025 total
Function and subfunction	FY2019 total	Base	OCO	Emergency	Total	Base	OCO	Total	FY2022 total	FY2023 total	FY2024 total	FY2025 total
051 - DoD discretionary												
Military personnel (no MERHFC) (Note: MERHFC is Medicare-Eligible Retiree Health Fund Contribution, administered separately by the treasury)	141,851	142,446	4,486		146,932	150,524	4,603	155,126	158,117	162,796	167,495	171,897
Operation and maintenance	281,801	234,885	53,735	977	289,597	230,352	58,569	288,921	279,501	282,530	296,585	301,993
Procurement	146,533	131,734	11,590	431	143,754	131,756	5,128	136,884	137,746	149,108	157,060	161,930
RDT&E	95,304	103,520	834	130	104,485	106,225	331	106,555	104,839	101,821	100,254	99,961
Revolving and management funds	1,873	1,564	20	234	1,818	1,349	20	1,369	1,347	1,358	1,381	1,410
DoD bill (no MERHFC)	667,362	614,149	70,665	1,772	686,586	620,206	68,651	688,855	681,550	697,613	722,775	737,191
Medicare-eligible retiree health fund contribution (MERHFC)	7,533	7,817			7,817	8,373		8,373	8,819	9,270	9,752	10,255
DoD bill with MERHFC	674,895	621,966	70,665	1,772	694,403	628,579	68,651	697,228	690,369	706,883	732,527	747,446
Military construction	11,332	9,850	645	6,229	16,723	6,462	350	6,812	10,036	8,623	8,379	9,233
Family housing	1,565	1,465			1,465	1,351		1,351	1,497	1,556	1,649	1,655
Military construction bill	12,897	11,315	645	6,229	18,188	7,813	350	8,163	11,533	10,179	10,028	10,888
Allowances	38											
Outyears placeholder for OCO									20,000	20,000	10,000	10,000
051 - Total DoD discretionary (DoD record)	687,830	633,281	71,310	8,000	712,591	636,392	69,000	705,392	721,902	737,063	752,555	768,334
Scoring and rounding	22				5							
051 - Total DoD discretionary (OMB record)	687,852				712,596			705,392	721,902	737,063	752,555	768,334
051 - DoD mandatory												
Military personnel	7,909				8,505			10,605	10,898	11,136	11,389	11,628
Operation and maintenance	1,328				997			1,368	1,184	1,154	1,173	1,193
Procurement	266				252			289				
RDT&E	230				240			153				
Revolving and management funds	16,742											
DoD bill	26,475				9,994			12,415	12,082	12,290	12,562	12,821
Military construction												
Family housing	39				36							
Military construction bill	39				36							
Trust funds	442				755			484	530	615	230	229
Offsetting receipts	-2,194				-1,753			-2,043	-1,922	-1,892	-1,912	-1,933
Interfund transactions	-46				-91			-86	-83	-79	-77	-74
051 - Total DoD mandatory (DoD record)	24,716				8,941			10,770	10,608	10,934	10,804	11,044
Scoring and rounding	2				7			5	309	200	115	41
051 - Total DoD mandatory (OMB record)	24,718				8,948			10,775	10,917	11,134	10,919	11,085

== Budget for FY2020 ==
For fiscal year 2020 (FY2020), the Department of Defense's budget authority was approximately $721.5 billion ($721,531,000,000). Approximately $712.6 billion is discretionary spending with approximately $8.9 billion in mandatory spending. The Department of Defense estimates that $689.6 billion ($689,585,000,000) will actually be spent (outlays). Both central right-wing and right-wing commentators have advocated for the cutting of military spending.

== Budget for FY2019 ==
For FY2019, the Department of Defense's budget authority was $693,058,000,000 (including discretionary and mandatory budget authority).

=== Budget request for FY2019 ===
In February 2018, the Pentagon requested $686 billion for FY2019.

The John S. McCain National Defense Authorization Act authorized Department of Defense appropriations for 2019 and established policies, but it did not contain the budget itself. On 26 July, this bill passed in the House of Representatives by 359–54. On 1 August, the US Senate passed it by 87–10. The bill was presented to President Trump two days later. He signed it on 13 August.

On 28 September 2018, Trump signed the Department of Defense appropriations bill. The approved 2019 Department of Defense discretionary budget was $686.1 billion. It has also been described as "$617 billion for the base budget and another $69 billion for war funding."

=== Total overview ===
National defense budget authority – discretionary and mandatory (in millions)
(Discretionary budget authority) + OCO + emergency (combined)	FY2019
Military personnel (without MERHFC)	$143,198
Operations and maintenance	$278,803
Procurement	$147,287
Research, Development, Test, and Evaluation	$95,253
Revolving and management funds	$1,656
Defense bill (without MERHFC)	$666,197
Medicare-eligible retiree health fund contribution (MERHFC)	$7,533
Department of Defense bill + MERHFC	$673,730
Military construction	$9,688
Family housing	$1,565
Military construction bill	$11,253
Total base + OCO + emergency (DoD record)	$684,985
Total DoD mandatory (DoD record)	$8,073
DoD total	$693,058

=== For personnel payment and benefits ===
Personnel payment and benefits take up approximately 39.14% of the total budget of $686,074,048,000.

Pay and benefits funding (in billions, base budget only)
Pay and benefits funding	FY2019
Military personnel appropriations	$140.7
Medicare-eligible retiree health care accruals	$7.5
Defense health program	$34.2
DoD Education Activity	$3.4
Family housing	$1.6
Commissary subsidy	$1.3
Other benefit programs	$3.4
Military pay and benefits	$192.0
Civilian pay and benefits	$76.4
Total pay and benefits	$268.5

=== By overseas contingency operation ===
Overseas contingency operations (OCO) funds are sometimes called war funds.

OCO funding by operation/activity (in billions)
Operation/activity	FY2019
Operation Freedom's Sentinel (OFS) and related missions	$46.3
Operation Inherent Resolve (OIR) and related missions	$15.3
European Deterrence Initiative (EDI)	$6.5
Security cooperation	$0.9
Grand total	$69.0

=== By military department ===
DoD Total (base + OCO + emergency) budget by military department (in billions)
Discretionary budget authority	FY2019
Department of the Army	$182
Department of the Navy (including Marines)	$194.1
Department of the Air Force	$194.2
Defense-wide	$115.8

=== Military health care funding ===
Military health care funding (in billions, base budget only)
Program	FY2019
Defense health (DHP)	$33.7
Military personnel	$8.9
Military construction	$0.4
Health care accrual	$7.5
Unified medical budget	$50.6
Treasury receipts for current Medicare-eligible retirees	$11.1

The MHS offers, but does not always provide, a health care benefit to 9.5 million eligible beneficiaries, which includes active military members and their families, military retirees and their families, dependent survivors, and certain eligible reserve component members and their families. The unified medical budget (UMB), which comprises the funding and personnel needed to support the MHS' mission, consumes nearly 9% of the department's topline budget authority. Thus, it is a significant line item in the department's financial portfolio.

== Previous budgets ==
As of 2013, the Department of Defense was the third largest executive branch department and utilized 20% of the federal budget.

For the 2011 fiscal year, the president's base budget for the Department of Defense and spending on overseas contingency operations totaled $664.84 billion.

When the budget was signed into law on 28 October 2009, the final size of the Department of Defense's budget was $680 billion, $16 billion more than President Obama had requested. An additional $37 billion supplemental bill to support the wars in Iraq and Afghanistan was expected to pass in the spring of 2010, but has been delayed by the House of Representatives after passing the Senate.

=== Emergency and supplemental spending ===
The military operations in Iraq and Afghanistan were largely funded through supplementary spending bills that supplemented the annual military budget requests for each fiscal year. However, the wars in Iraq and Afghanistan were categorized as overseas contingency operations beginning in fiscal year 2010, and the budget is included in the federal budget.

By the end of 2008, the US had spent approximately $900 billion in direct costs on the wars in Iraq and Afghanistan. The government also incurred indirect costs, which include interests on additional debt and incremental costs, financed by the Veterans Affairs Department, of caring for more than 33,000 wounded. Some experts estimate the indirect costs will eventually exceed the direct costs. As of June 2011, the total cost of the wars was approximately $1.3 trillion.

=== By title ===
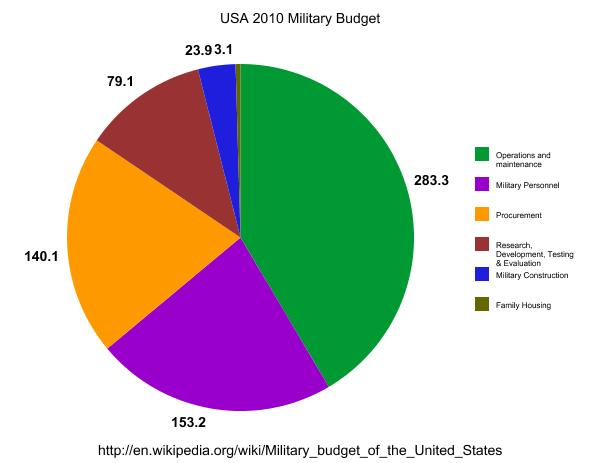
US 2010 military budget spending

The federally budgeted (see below) military expenditure of the Department of Defense for fiscal year 2013 is as follows. While data is provided from the 2015 budget, data for 2014 and 2015 is estimated, and thus data is shown for the last year for which definite data exists (2013).

Components	Funding	Change, 2012 to 2013
Operations and maintenance	$258.277 billion	−9.9%
Military personnel	$153.531 billion	−3.0%
Procurement	$97.757 billion	−17.4%
Research, Development, Testing & Evaluation	$63.347 billion	−12.1%
Military construction	$8.069 billion	−29.0%
Family housing	$1.483 billion	−12.2%
Other miscellaneous costs	$2.775 billion	−59.5%
Atomic energy defense activities	$17.424 billion	−4.8%
Defense-related activities	$7.433 billion	−3.8%
Total spending	$610.096 billion	−10.5%

=== By entity ===
Entity	2010 budget request	Percentage	Notes
Army	$244.8 billion	31.8%	
Navy	$142.2 billion	23.4%	Excluding Marine Corps
Air Force	$170.6 billion	22%	
Defense-wide joint activities	$118.7 billion	15.5%	
Marine Corps	$11.0 billion	4%	Total budget allotted from the Department of the Navy
Defense Intelligence	$80.1 billion	3.3%	Because of its classified nature, this budget item is an estimate and may not be the actual figure

=== Programs spending more than $1.5 billion ===
The Department of Defense's FY2011 $137.5 billion procurement and $77.2 billion RDT&E budget requests included several programs worth more than $1.5 billion.

Program	2011 budget request	Change, 2010 to 2011
F-35 Joint Strike Fighter	$11.4 billion	+2.1%
Missile Defense Agency (THAAD, Aegis, GMD, PAC-3)	$9.9 billion	+7.3%
Virginia class submarine	$5.4 billion	+28.0%
Brigade combat team Modernization	$3.2 billion	+21.8%
DDG 51 Burke-class Aegis destroyer	$3.0 billion	+19.6%
P–8A Poseidon	$2.9 billion	−1.6%
V-22 Osprey	$2.8 billion	−6.5%
Carrier replacement program	$2.7 billion	+95.8%
F/A-18E/F Hornet	$2.0 billion	+17.4%
Predator and Reaper unmanned aerial system	$1.9 billion	+57.8%
Littoral combat ship	$1.8 billion	+12.5%
CVN Refueling and Complex Overhaul	$1.7 billion	−6.0%
Chemical demilitarization	$1.6 billion	−7.0%
RQ-4 Global Hawk	$1.5 billion	+6.7%
Space-Based Infrared System	$1.5 billion	+54.0%

=== Other military-related expenditures ===
This does not include many military-related items that are outside of the Defense Department budget, such as nuclear weapons research, maintenance, cleanup, and production, which are in the Atomic Energy Defense Activities section, Veterans Affairs, the Treasury Department's payments in pensions to military retirees and widows and their families, interest on debt incurred in past wars, or State Department financing of foreign arms sales and militarily-related development assistance. Neither does it include defense spending that is domestic rather than international in nature, such as the Department of Homeland Security, counter-terrorism spending by the Federal Bureau of Investigation, and intelligence-gathering spending by NSA, although these programs contain certain weapons, military and security components.

Accounting for non DoD military-related expenditure gives a total budget in excess of $1.4 trillion.

=== Budget request for FY2018 ===
On 16 March 2017 President Trump submitted his request to Congress for $639 billion in military spending (an increase of $54 billion, 10% for FY2018, as well as $30 billion for FY2017, which ends in September). With a total federal budget of $3.9 trillion for FY2018, the increase in military spending would result in deep cuts to many other federal agencies and domestic programs, as well as the State Department. Trump had pledged to "rebuild" the military as part of his 2016 presidential campaign.

In April 2017, journalist Scot J. Paltrow raised concerns about the increase in spending with the Pentagon's history of "faulty accounting".

On 14 July, the National Defense Authorization Act 2018 was passed by the US House of Representatives 344–81, with 8 not voting. 60% of Democrats voted for the bill, which represented an 18% increase in defense spending. Congress increased the budget to total $696 billion.

=== Budget request for FY2017 ===
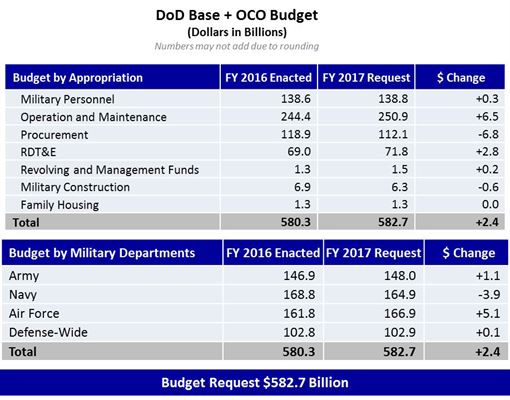
Appropriated 2016 budget and proposed 2017 budget

The currently available budget request for 2017 was filed on 9 February 2016, under then-President Barack Obama.

The press release of the proposal specifies the structure and goals for the FY2017 budget:

The FY2017 budget reflects recent strategic threats and changes that have taken place in Asia, the Middle East and Europe. Russian aggression, terrorism by the Islamic State of Iraq and the Levant (ISIL) and others, and China's island building and claims of sovereignty in international waters all necessitate changes in our strategic outlook and in our operational commitments. Threats and actions originating in Iran and North Korea negatively affect our interests and our allies. These challenges have sharpened the focus of our planning and budgeting.

The proposal also includes a comparison of the 2016 and the proposed 2017 request amounts, a summary of acquisitions requested for 2017 and enacted in 2016, and provides in detail a breakdown of specific programs to be funded.

==== Investments ====
	FY2016 enacted	FY2017 request	Change
Aircraft and related systems	50.6	45.3	−5.3
C4I systems	7.1	7.4	0.3
Ground systems	9.9	9.8	−0.1
Missile defense programs	9.1	8.5	−0.6
Missiles and munitions	12.7	13.9	1.2
Mission support	52.9	52.4	−0.5
Science & technology (S&T)	13.0	12.5	−0.5
Shipbuilding and maritime systems	27.5	27.0	−0.5
Space-based systems	7.0	7.1	0.1
Rescissions	−1.8	-	+1.8
Total	188	183.9	−4.1

Amounts are in billions of dollars.

==== Major acquisition programs ====
These are the top 25 DoD weapon programs described in detail. Quantity refers to the number of items requested:

		FY2016		FY2017	
		Quantity	Dollars in billions	Quantity	Dollars in billions
Aircraft
F-35	Joint Strike Fighter	68	11.6	63	10.5
KC-46A	Tanker	12	3.0	15	3.3
P-8A	Poseidon	17	3.4	11	2.2
V-22	Osprey	20	1.6	16	1.5
E-2D AHE	Advanced Hawkeye	5	1.2	6	1.4
AH-64E	Apache helicopter	64	1.4	52	1.1
C/HC/MC-130J	Hercules	29	2.4	14	1.3
UH-60	Black Hawk helicopter	107	1.8	36	1.0
CH-53K	King Stallion helicopter	--	0.6	2	0.8
MQ-4C	Triton	4	1.0	2	0.8
H-1 Upgrades	Bell helicopter	29	0.9	24	0.8
NGJ	Next Generation Jammer increment 1	--	0.4	--	0.6
CH-47F	Chinook helicopter	39	1.1	22	0.7
Missile defense/missiles
BMDS	Ballistic missile defense	--	7.7	--	6.9
Trident II	Trident II missile modifications	--	1.2	--	1.2
AMRAAM	Advanced Medium Range Air to Air Missile	429	0.7	419	0.7
Ships
SSN 774	Virginia submarine	2	5.7	2	5.3
DDG 51	Aegis destroyer	2	4.4	2	3.5
CVN 78	Ford aircraft carrier	--	2.8	--	2.8
ORR	Ohio replacement	--	1.4	--	1.9
LHA-6	Amphibious assault ship	--	0.5	1	1.6
LCS	Littoral combat ship	3	1.8	2	1.6
Space
AEHF	Advanced Extremely High Frequency satellite	--	0.6	--	0.9
EELV	Evolved Expendable Launch Vehicle	4	1.5	5	1.8
Trucks
JLTV	Joint Light Tactical Vehicle	804	0.4	2,020	0.7

==== Science and technology program ====
This program's purpose is to "invest in and develop capabilities that advance the technical superiority of the US military to counter new and emerging threats." It has a budget of $12.5 billion, but is separate from the overall Research, Development, Test, and Evaluation portfolio, which comprises $71.8 billion. Efforts funded apply to the Obama administration's refocusing of the US military to Asia, identifying investments to "sustain and advance [the] DoD's military dominance for the 21st century", counter the "technological advances of US foes", and support Manufacturing Initiative institutes. A breakdown of the amounts provided, by tier of research, is provided:

Program	FY2016 request	FY2016 enacted	FY2017 request	Change (FY16 enacted − FY17 request)
Basic research	2.1	2.3	2.1	−0.2
Applied research	4.7	5.0	4.8	−0.2
Advanced technology development	5.5	5.7	5.6	−0.1
Total	12.3	13.0	12.5	-0.5

==== Total budget by department ====
Total budget	FY2016 enacted	FY2017 request	Change
Army	146,928,044	148,033,950	+1,105,906
Navy	168,786,798	164,861,078	-3,925,720
Air Force	161,783,330	166,879,239	+5,095,909
Defense-wide	102,801,512	102,927,320	+125,808
Total	580,299,684	582,701,587	+2,401,903

Amounts in thousands of dollars

==== Total budget by component ====
Total budget	FY2016 enacted	FY2017 request	Change
Military personnel	138,552,886	138,831,498	+278,612
Operation and maintenance	244,434,932	250,894,310	+6,459,378
Procurement	118,866,320	112,081,088	-6,785,232
Research, Development, Test, and Evaluation	69,009,764	71,765,940	+2,756,176
Revolving and management funds	1,264,782	1,512,246	+247,464
Military construction	6,909,712	6,296,653	-613,059
Family housing	1,261,288	1,319,852	+58,564
Total	580,299,684	582,701,587	+2,401,903

Amounts in thousands of dollars

===== Funding of payments and benefits =====
This portion of the military budget comprises roughly one third to one half of the total defense budget, considering only military personnel or additionally including civilian personnel, respectively. These expenditures will typically be, the single largest expense category for the department. Since 2001, military pay and benefits have increased by 85%, but remained roughly one third of the total budget due to an overall increased budget. Military pay remains at about the 70th percentile compared to the private sector to attract sufficient amounts of qualified personnel.

Military pay and benefits funding	FY2016 enacted	FY2017 request
Military personnel appropriations	128.7	128.9
Medicare-eligible retiree health care accruals	6.6	6.4
Defense health program	32.9	33.8
DoD Education Activity	3.1	2.9
Family housing	1.3	1.3
Commissary subsidy	1.4	1.2
Other benefit programs	3.5	3.4
Military pay and benefits funding	177.5	177.9
Civilian pay and benefits funding	71.8	72.9
Total pay and benefits funding	249.3	250.8
DoD base budget authority	521.7	523.9
Military pay and benefits as % of budget	34.0%	34.0%
Total pay and benefits as % of budget	47.8%	47.9%

===== Funding the military health system =====
The request for 2017 amounts to $48.8 billion. The system has 9.4 million beneficiaries, including active, retired, and eligible reserve component military personnel and their families, and dependent survivors.

Program	FY2017 request
Defense health (DHP)	33.5
Military personnel	8.6
Military construction	0.3
Health care accrual	6.4
Unified medical budget	48.8

=== Budget for 2016 ===
On 9 February 2016, the Department of Defense under President Obama released a statement outlining the proposed 2016 and 2017 defense spending budgets that "[reflect] the priorities necessary for our force today and in the future to best serve and protect our nation in a rapidly changing security environment."

Budget by appropriation
Components	Dollars in billions
Military personnel	138.6
Operation and maintenance	244.4
Procurement	118.9
RDT&E	69.0
Revolving and management funds	1.3
Military construction	6.9
Family housing	1.3
Total	580.3

Budget by military department
Departments	Dollars in billions
Army	146.9
Navy	168.8
Air Force	161.8
Defense-wide	102.8
Total	580.3

=== Audit of 2011 budget ===
Again in 2011, the Government Accountability Office (GAO) could not "render an opinion on the 2011 consolidated financial statements of the federal government", with a major obstacle again being "serious financial management problems at the Department of Defense (DOD) that made its financial statements unauditable".

In December 2011, the GAO found that "neither the Navy nor the Marine Corps have implemented effective processes for reconciling their FBWT." According to the GAO, "An agency's FBWT account is similar in concept to a corporate bank account. The difference is that instead of a cash balance, FBWT represents unexpended spending authority in appropriations." In addition, "As of April 2011, there were more than $22 billion unmatched disbursements and collections affecting more than 10,000 lines of accounting."

=== Audit of implementation of budget for 2010 ===
The GAO was unable to provide an audit opinion on the 2010 financial statements of the US Government due to "widespread material internal control weaknesses, significant uncertainties, and other limitations." The GAO cited as the principal obstacle to its provision of an audit opinion "serious financial management problems at the Department of Defense that made its financial statements unauditable".

In FY2010, six out of thirty-three DoD reporting entities received unqualified audit opinions.

Robert F. Hale, Chief Financial Officer and Under Secretary of Defense, acknowledged enterprise-wide problems with systems and processes, while the DoD's Inspector General reported "material internal control weaknesses ... that affect the safeguarding of assets, proper use of funds, and impair the prevention and identification of fraud, waste, and abuse". Further management discussion in the FY2010 DoD Financial Report states "it is not feasible to deploy a vast number of accountants to manually reconcile our books" and concludes that "although the financial statements are not auditable for FY2010, the Department's financial managers are meeting warfighter needs".

=== Budget by year ===
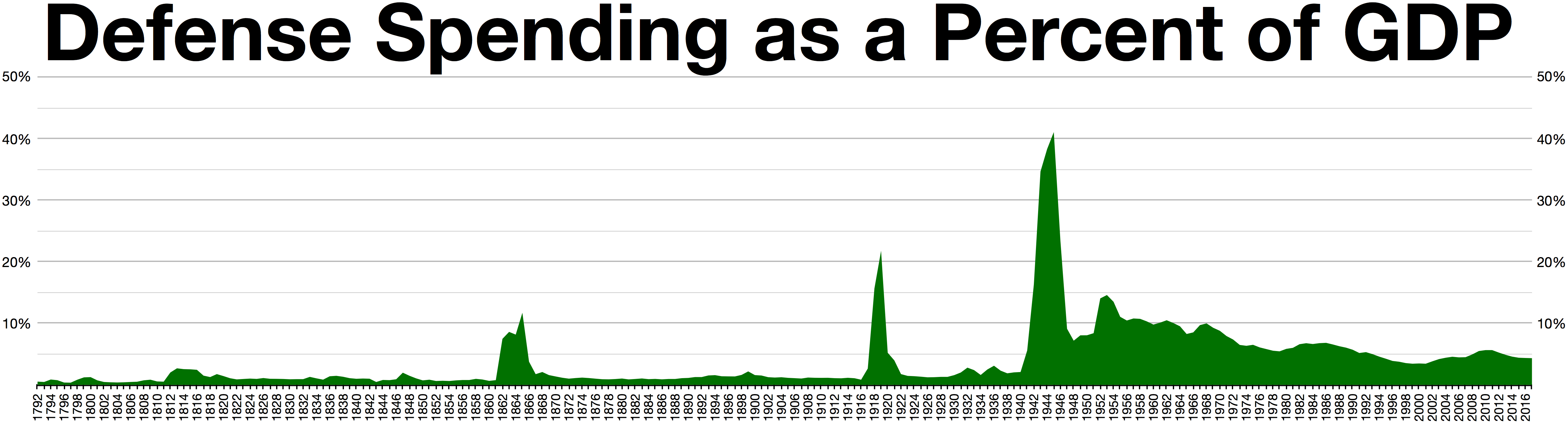
Defense Spending as a Percent of GDP 1792–2017

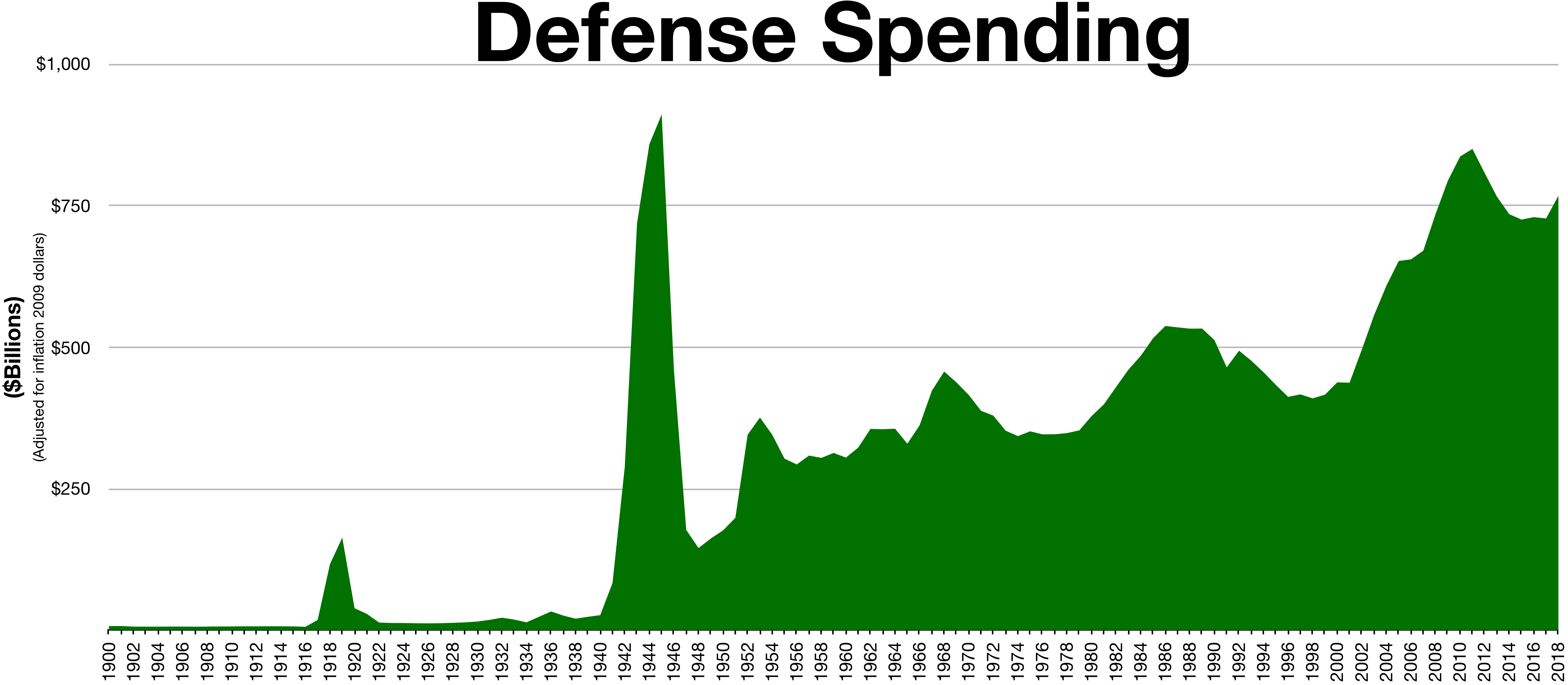
Historical defense spending

The accompanying graphs show that US military spending as a percent of gross domestic product (GDP) peaked during World War II.

The table shows historical spending on defense from 1993 to 2025. The defense budget is shown in billions of dollars and total budget in trillions of dollars. The percentage of the total US federal budget spent on defense is indicated in the third row, and change in defense spending from the previous year in the final row.

Historical defense spending 1993–2025
Year	Defense budget (billions)	Total budget (trillions)	Defense budget %	Defense spending % change
2025	$962	$7.00	13.7	+0.8
2024	$910	$7.05	12.9	-0.8
2023	$905	$6.56	13.7	+1.0
2022	$838	$6.58	12.7	+2.1
2021	$759	$7.14	10.6	+0.6
2020	$774	$7.73	10.0	-5.8
2019	$745	$4.70	15.8	-0.4
2018	$726	$4.46	16.2	+0.4
2017	$656	$4.15	15.8	-0.7
2016	$624	$3.97	16.5	+0.7
2015	$598	$3.77	15.8	-1.4
2014	$622	$3.61	17.2	-0.3
2013	$610	$3.48	17.5	−1.6
2012	$681	$3.58	19.1	−1.3
2011	$717	$3.51	20.4	−0.3
2010	$721	$3.48	20.7	+3.6
2009	$698	$4.08	17.1	-3.8
2008	$696	$3.32	20.9	+1.0
2007	$625	$2.86	21.9	+1.9
2006	$556	$2.78	20.0	+0.4
2005	$506	$2.58	19.6	-0.8
2004	$491	$2.41	20.4	+0.3
2003	$456	$2.27	20.1	+2.8
2002	$362	$2.09	17.3	+0.2
2001	$335	$1.96	17.1	+0.4
2000	$304	$1.82	16.7	+0.3
1999	$292	$1.78	16.4	+0.4
1998	$271	$1.69	16.0	-0.5
1997	$270	$1.64	16.5	-0.3
1996	$266	$1.58	16.8	−3.5
1995	$272	$1.34	20.3	+0.5
1994	$308	$1.55	19.8	-0.5
1993	$316	$1.55	20.3	0.0

== Support service contractors ==
The role of support service contractors has increased since 2001 and in 2007 payments for contractor services exceeded investments in equipment for the armed forces for the first time. In the 2010 budget, the support service contractors will be reduced from the current 39 percent of the workforce down to the pre-2001 level of 26 percent. In a Pentagon review of January 2011, service contractors were found to be "increasingly unaffordable."

== Military budget and total federal spending ==
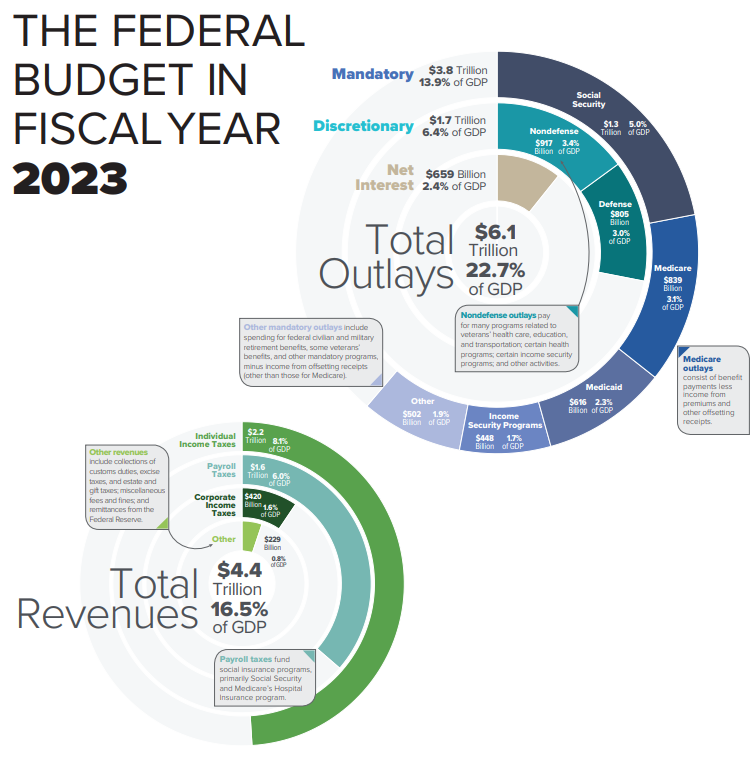
CBO Infographic showing 2023 federal spending

The Department of Defense budget accounted in FY2017 for about 14.8% of federal budgeted expenditures. According to the Congressional Budget Office, defense spending grew 9% annually on average in fiscal years 2000–2009.

Because of constitutional limitations, military funding is appropriated in a discretionary spending account. (Such accounts permit government planners to have more flexibility to change spending each year, as opposed to mandatory spending accounts that mandate spending on programs in accordance with the law, outside of the budgetary process.) In recent years, discretionary spending as a whole has amounted to about one-third of total federal outlays. Department of Defense spending's share of discretionary spending was 50.5% in 2003, and has risen to between 53% and 54% in recent years.

For FY2017, Department of Defense spending amounts to 3.42% of GDP. Because the US GDP has grown over time, the military budget can rise in absolute terms while shrinking as a percentage of the GDP. For example, the Department of Defense budget was slated to be $664 billion in 2010 (including the cost of operations in Iraq and Afghanistan previously funded through supplementary budget legislation), higher than at any other point in American history, but still 1.1–1.4% lower as a percentage of GDP than the amount spent on military during the peak of Cold-War military spending in the late 1980s. Admiral Mike Mullen, former Chairman of the Joint Chiefs of Staff, has called four percent an "absolute floor". This calculation does not take into account some other military-related non-DoD spending, such as Veterans Affairs, Homeland Security, and interest paid on debt incurred in past wars, which has increased even as a percentage of the national GDP.

In 2015, Pentagon and related spending totaled $598 billion.

In addition, the US will spend at least $179 billion over the fiscal years of 2010–2018 on its nuclear arsenal, averaging $20 billion per year. Despite President Barack Obama's attempts in the media to reduce the scope of the current nuclear arms race, the US intends to spend an additional $1 trillion over the next 30 years modernizing its nuclear arsenal.

In September 2017 the Senate followed President Donald Trump's plan to expand military spending, which will boost spending to $700 billion, about 91.4% of which will be spent on maintaining the armed forces and primary Pentagon costs. Military spending is increasing regularly and more money is being spent every year on employee pay, operation and maintenance, and benefits including health benefits. Methods to counteract rapidly increasing spending include shutting down bases, but that was banned by the Bipartisan Budget Act of 2013.

=== Independent analysis of military budget as part of federal spending ===
War Resisters League (WRL) has been publishing yearly (since 2001 or earlier) federal budget breakdowns which show that military-related spending is a much larger part of the US federal budget than typically reported by official sources. For example, for FY2024, WRL claims that military-related spending makes up 43% of the US budget.

== Federal waste ==
As of September 2014, the Department of Defense was estimated to have "$857 million in excess parts and supplies". This figure has risen over the past years, and of the Pentagon waste that has been calculated, two figures are especially worth mentioning: the expenditure of "$150 million on private villas for a handful of Pentagon employees in Afghanistan and the procurement of the JLENS air-defense balloon" which, throughout the program's development over the past two decades, is estimated to have cost $2.7 billion.

== Comparison with other countries ==
Further information: List of countries with highest military expenditures

Military spending, top 25 countries by % GDP, 2024
Country	% GDP spent on military
Ukraine	34.5
Israel	8.8
Algeria	8.0
Saudi Arabia	7.3
Russia	7.1
Myanmar	6.8
Oman	5.6
Armenia	5.5
Azerbaijan	5.0
Kuwait	4.8
Jordan	4.8
Burkina Faso	4.7
Mali	4.2
Poland	4.2
Burundi	3.8
Brunei	3.6
Morocco	3.5
United States	3.4
Estonia	3.4
Colombia	3.4
Latvia	3.3
Greece	3.1
Lithuania	3.1
Chad	3.0
Kyrgyzstan	3.0

Military spending, top 25 countries by PPP, 2024
Country	$billions spent on military
United States	997
China	567
Russia	401
India	308
Ukraine	183
South Korea	96
Germany	99
Japan	91
France	91
United Kingdom	86
Brazil	64
Poland	62
Italy	60
Turkey	59
Indonesia	47
Colombia	43
Mexico	40
Spain	39
Australia	31
Canada	31
Netherlands	21
Philippines	21
Romania	21
Greece	17
Malaysia	14

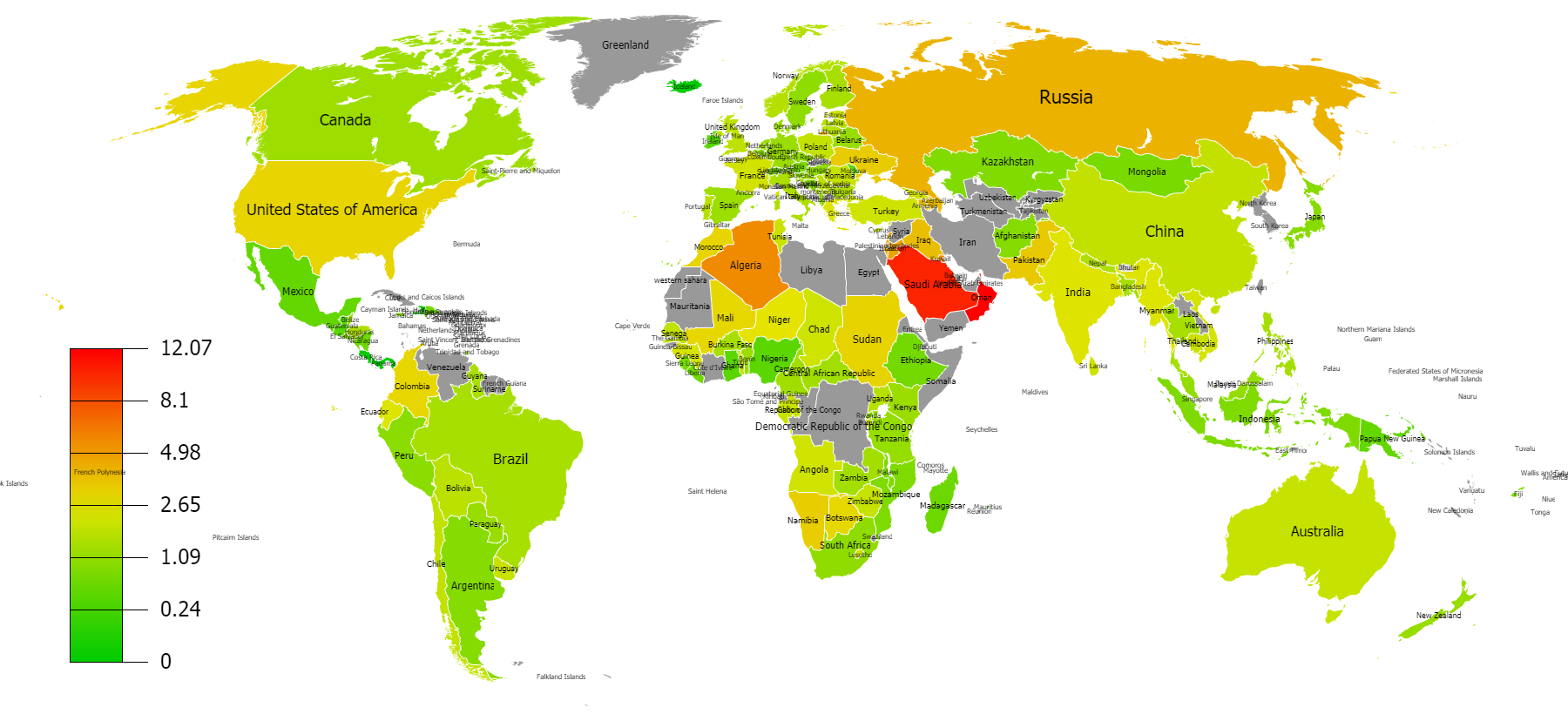
Map of military expenditures as a percentage of GDP by country, 2017

The US spends more on national defense than China, India, Russia, Saudi Arabia, France, Germany, United Kingdom, Japan, South Korea, and Brazil combined. The 2018 US military budget accounts for approximately 36% of global arms spending (for comparison, US GDP is only 24% of global GDP). The 2018 budget is approximately 2.5 times larger than the $250 billion military budget of China. The US and its close allies are responsible for two-thirds to three-quarters of the world's military spending (of which, in turn, the US is responsible for the majority). The US also maintains the largest number of military bases on foreign soil in the world. While there are no freestanding foreign bases permanently located in the US, there are now around 800 US bases in foreign countries. Military spending makes up nearly 16% of entire federal spending and approximately half of discretionary spending. In a general sense discretionary spending (defense and non-defense spending) makes up one-third of the annual federal budget.

In 2016, the US spent 3.29% of its GDP on its military (considering only basic Department of Defense budget spending), more than France's 2.26% and less than Saudi Arabia's 9.85%. This is historically low for the US since it peaked in 1944 at 37.8% of GDP (it reached the lowest point of 3.0% in 1999–2001). Even during the peak of the Vietnam War the percentage reached a high of 9.4% in 1968.

In 2018, the US spent 3.2% of its GDP on its military, while Saudi Arabia spent 8.8%, Israel spent 4.3%, Pakistan spent 4.0%, Russia spent 3.9%, South Korea spent 2.6%, China spent 1.9%, United Kingdom spent 1.8%, and Germany spent 1.2% of its GDP on defense.

== Past commentary on military budget ==
In 2009 Robert Gates, then Secretary of Defense, wrote that the US should adjust its priorities and spending to address the changing nature of threats in the world: "What all these potential adversaries—from terrorist cells to rogue nations to rising powers—have in common is that they have learned that it is unwise to confront the United States directly on conventional military terms. The United States cannot take its current dominance for granted and needs to invest in the programs, platforms, and personnel that will ensure that dominance's persistence. But it is also important to keep some perspective. As much as the US Navy has shrunk since the end of the Cold War, for example, in terms of tonnage, its battle fleet is still larger than the next 13 navies combined—and 11 of those 13 navies are US allies or partners." Secretary Gates announced some of his budget recommendations in April 2009.

According to a 2009 Congressional Research Service report there was a discrepancy between a budget that is declining as a percentage of GDP while the responsibilities of the DoD have not decreased and additional pressures on the military budget have arisen due to broader missions in the post-9/11 world, dramatic increases in personnel and operating costs, and new requirements resulting from wartime lessons in the Iraq War and Operation Enduring Freedom.

Expenses for fiscal years 2001 through 2010 were analyzed by Russell Rumbaugh, a retired Army officer and ex-CIA military analyst, in a report for the Stimson Center. Rumbaugh wrote: "Between 1981 and 1990, the Air Force bought 2,063 fighters. In contrast, between 2001 and 2010, it bought only 220. Yet between 2001 and 2010 the Air Force spent $38B of procurement funding just on fighter aircraft in inflation-adjusted dollars, compared with the $68B it spent between 1981 and 1990. In other words, the Air Force spent 55 percent as much money to get 10 percent as many fighters." As Adam Weinstein explained one of the report's findings: "Of the roughly $1 trillion spent on gadgetry since 9/11, 22 percent of it came from supplemental war funding – annual outlays that are voted on separately from the regular defense budget."

Most of the $5 billion in budget cuts for 2013 that were mandated by Congress in 2012 really only shifted expenses from the general military budget to the Afghanistan war budget. Declaring that nearly 65,000 troops were temporary rather than part of the permanent forces resulted in the reallocation of $4 billion in existing expenses to this different budget.

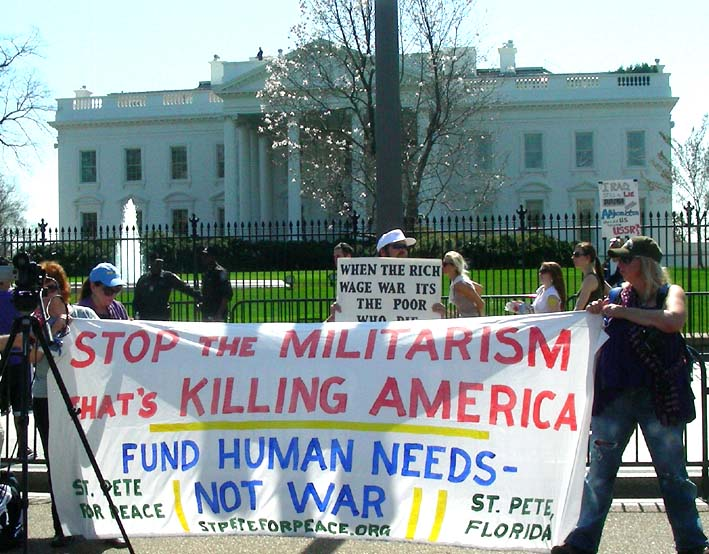
Anti-war protest in Washington, D.C., 20 March 2010

In May 2012, as part of Obama's East Asia "pivot", his 2013 national military request moved funding from the Army and Marines to favor the Navy, but Congress has resisted this.

Reports emerged in February 2014 that Secretary of Defense Chuck Hagel was planning to trim the defense budget by billions of dollars. The secretary in his first defense budget planned to limit pay rises, increase fees for healthcare benefits, freeze the pay of senior officers, reduce military housing allowances, and reduce the size of the force.

In July 2014, American Enterprise Institute scholar Michael Auslin opined in the National Review that the Air Force needs to be fully funded as a priority, due to the air superiority, global airlift, and long-range strike capabilities it provides.

In January 2015, the Defense Department published its internal study on how to save $125 billion on its military budget from 2016 to 2020 by renegotiating vendor contracts and pushing for stronger deals, and by offering workers early retirement and retraining.

=== 2012 fiscal cliff ===
On 5 December 2012, the Department of Defense announced it was planning for automatic spending cuts, which include $500 billion and an additional $487 billion due to the 2011 Budget Control Act, due to the fiscal cliff. According to Politico, the Department of Defense declined to explain to the House of Representatives Appropriations Committee, which controls federal spending, what its plans were regarding the fiscal cliff planning.

This was after half a dozen members of Congress very experienced in military matters either resigned from Congress or lost their reelection fights, including Joe Lieberman (I-CT).

Lawrence Korb has noted that given recent trends military entitlements and personnel costs will take up the entire defense budget by 2039.

== GAO audits ==
The GAO was unable to provide an audit opinion on the 2010 financial statements of the US government due to "widespread material internal control weaknesses, significant uncertainties, and other limitations." The GAO cited as the principal obstacle to its provision of an audit opinion "serious financial management problems at the Department of Defense that made its financial statements unauditable."

In FY2011, seven out of 33 DoD reporting entities received unqualified audit opinions. Under Secretary of Defense Robert F. Hale acknowledged enterprise-wide weaknesses with controls and systems. Further management discussion in the FY2011 DoD Financial Report states "we are not able to deploy the vast numbers of accountants that would be required to reconcile our books manually". Congress has established a deadline of FY2017 for the DoD to achieve audit readiness.

For FYs 1998–2010 the Department of Defense's financial statements were either unauditable or such that no audit opinion could be expressed. Several years behind other government agencies, the first results from an army of about 2,400 contracted DoD auditors were expected on 15 November 2018.

== Post–World War II overview and reform ==
=== Post–World War II ===
The conclusion of World War II and the start of the Cold War prompted the rapid expansion of an arms race. Subsequently, the reallocation of budgets, prompted by several wars and proxy wars forced the Department of Defense to increase research and development of new military systems and equipment to proliferate on a mass scale to compete with, at the time, the Soviet Union. On 17 January 1961, then-President Dwight D. Eisenhower in a farewell address to the US warned the people and government about the creation of a "military-industrial complex". As prompted by President Eisenhower, the war had arguably become an industry. It was also speculated by Eisenhower that the arms industry would bring war-like industrial influence into the various sectors of government. He stated: "In the councils of government, we must guard against the acquisition of unwarranted influence, whether sought or unsought, by the military-industrial complex. The potential for the disastrous rise of misplaced power exists and will persist."

Following the departure of President Eisenhower, the expenditures and budgets of the US military grew exponentially. The Cold War (1947–1991) developed the largest proliferation of a nuclear arsenal to date. New defense contractors stood up to supply the demand for the military and its various conflicts across the globe. In addition, the Vietnam War was the largest expenditure during the Cold War at approximately $168 billion or about $1 trillion in today's inflated costs.

In a statement of 6 January 2011, Defense Secretary Robert M. Gates stated: "This department simply cannot risk continuing down the same path – where our investment priorities, bureaucratic habits and lax attitude towards costs are increasingly divorced from the real threats of today, the growing perils of tomorrow and the nation's grim financial outlook." Gates has proposed a budget that, if approved by Congress, would reduce the costs of many DoD programs and policies, including reports, the IT infrastructure, fuel, weapon programs, DoD bureaucracies, and personnel.

The 2015 expenditure for Army research, development and acquisition changed from $32 billion projected in 2012 for FY2015, to $21 billion for FY2015 expected in 2014.

In 2018, it was announced that the Department of Defense was the subject of a comprehensive budgetary audit. This review was conducted by private, third-party accounting consultants. The audit ended and was deemed incomplete due to deficient accounting practices in the department.

In FY2022, the US had the largest defense budget and expenditures of any other country in the world totaling around $777.1 billion. The rise in the military budget over the last decade can be traced to the production of new technologies such as a 5th generation fighter aircraft to meet the increase in demand for new combat capabilities. Many of these costs were the result of R&D, or research and development. Research and development is one of the US's primary focuses in the defense budget.

Opponents of growing military spending budgets have long argued that the US should refocus and reallocate the military budgets to promote social welfare. However, the projections for the near future are that the defense budget and its expenditures are only going to continue to grow exponentially. In the published FY2022 budget report, the authority has been given to increase the defense budget by about $17 billion ($535 billion of which is a part of contract obligations) from FY2021. In addition, the Biden administration has proposed another increase of the FY2023 budget to $737 billion. On the contrary, proponents of increasing the US Defense budgets have long argued that factors such as China and other adversaries of the US must be kept in check (from a military standpoint).

== See also ==
- International affairs budget of the United States
- United States intelligence budget
