= James McGann =

American academic (1955–2021)

Jim McGann
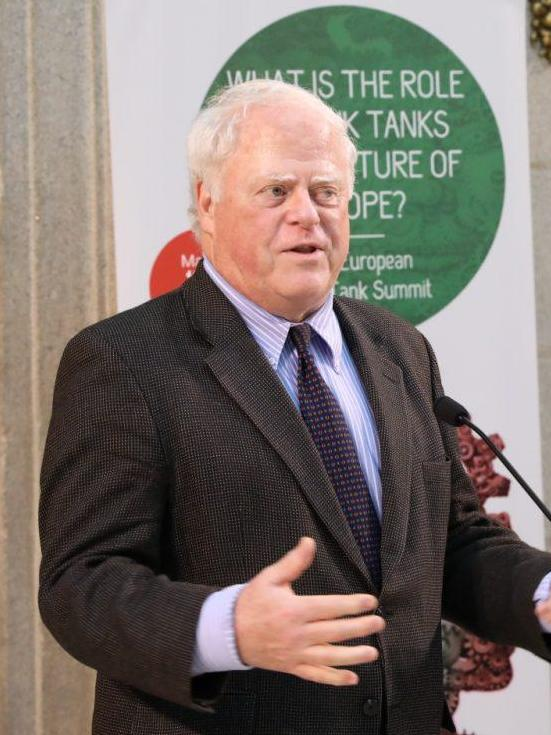

Personal details
- Born: January 8, 1955
- Died: November 29, 2021 (aged 66)
- Education: La Salle University (BA); Temple University (MA); University of Pennsylvania (MPA, PhD)
- Website: gotothinktank.com

James G. McGann (1955–2021) was an American academic who was a Senior Lecturer in International Studies, Founder and Director of the Think Tanks and Civil Societies Program at the Lauder Institute at the University of Pennsylvania and a senior fellow at the Foreign Policy Research Institute, both in Philadelphia.

McGann was the author of numerous publications, including the renowned annual Global Go To Think Tank Index which ranks think tanks in all regions of the world. His most recent book was "Think Tanks: The New Knowledge and Policy Brokers in Asia" published by the Brookings Institution Press.

He died on November 29, 2021.

== Publications ==
- Competition for Dollars, Scholars, and Influence in the Public Policy Research Industry (University Press of America 1995)
- The International Survey of Think Tanks (Foreign Policy Research Institute 1999)
- Think Tanks and Civil Societies: Catalyst for Ideas and Action, co-edited with Kent B. Weaver (Transaction Publishers 2000)
- Ideas and Influence: Think Tanks, Politics and Public Policy, (Edward Elgar Publishing, 2003)
- Comparative Think Tanks, Politics And Public Policy, (Edward Elgar Publishing, 2006)
- Think Tanks and Policy Advice in the U.S.: Academics, Advisors, and Advocates (Routledge 2007)
- Global Trends and Transitions: 2007 Survey of Think Tanks (Foreign Policy Research Institute 2008)
- The 2007 Global Go to Think Tanks (Foreign Policy Research Institute 2008); "Think Tank Index" (Foreign Policy Magazine 2009)
- The 2008 Global Go to Think Tank Index (IRP, University of Pennsylvania 2009)
- Democratization and Market Reform: Think Tanks As Catalysts (Routledge 2009)
- Catalysts for Economic Growth and Development: The Role of Think Tanks in Brazil, Russia, India, China and South Africa (CIPE 2009)
- The 2009 Global Go to Think Tank Index (University of Pennsylvania 2010)
- Global Think Tanks: Policy Networks and Governance (Global Institutions), (Routledge, 2010)
- The 2010 Global Go to Think Tank Index (University of Pennsylvania 2011)
- The 2011 Global Go to Think Tank Index (University of Pennsylvania 2012)
- Think Tanks and Global Policy Networks, chapter in edited volume, International Organization and Global governance, (Routledge 2013)
- The 2012 Global Go to Think Tank Index (University of Pennsylvania 2013)
- Think Tanks and Social Development Policy: A Global Comparative Study (University of Pennsylvania Press 2013)
- The 2013 Global Go to Think Tank Index (University of Pennsylvania 2013)
- Think Tanks, Policy Advice and the Foreign Policy Challenges Facing Emerging Powers (2014)
- How Think Tanks Shape Social Development Policies (University of Pennsylvania Press 2014)
- The 2014 Global Go to Think Tank Index (University of Pennsylvania 2014)
- The 2015 Global Go to Think Tank Index (University of Pennsylvania 2015)
- Think Tanks and SDGs: Catalysts for Analysis, Innovation and Implementation (TTCSP 2015)
- The 2016 Global Go to Think Tank Index (University of Pennsylvania 2016)
- Trends and Transitions in Security Expertise from Deterrence to Climate Change and Back Again (Routledge 2017)
- The 2017 Global Go to Think Tank Index (University of Pennsylvania 2017)
- The 2018 Global Go to Think Tank Index (University of Pennsylvania 2019)
- Think Tanks Foreign Policy the Emerging Powers (Palgrave MacMillan 2019)
- Think Tanks and Emerging Power Policy Networks (Palgrave 2019)
- Think Tanks: the New Knowledge Brokers and Policy Advisers In Asia (Brookings Press 2019)
- "For think tanks, it's either innovate or die" (Washington Post 2019)
