= Sanjay Jain =

British economist

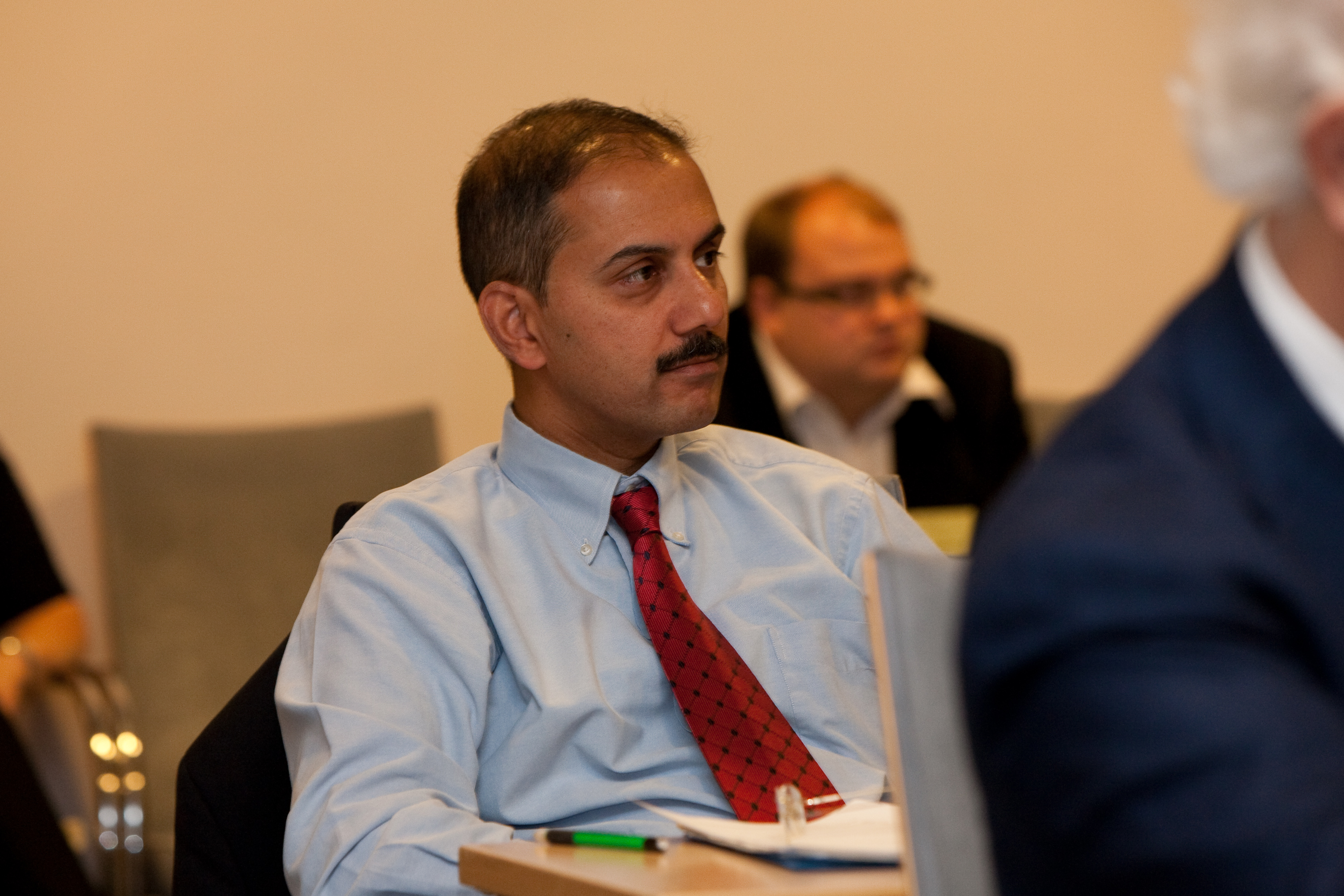

Academic background
- Education: Princeton University; St Stephen's College, Delhi; Delhi University

Academic work
- Discipline: Development economics
- Institutions: University of Oxford
- Website: Information at IDEAS / RePEc

Notes
- Thesis Essays in the economics of the informal sector: the role of information and institutions in product, labor, and credit markets. (1995)

Sanjay Jain is a senior fellow at the University of Oxford with research interest in development economics. He was an assistant professor of economics at the University of Virginia from 2001 to 2009. Before he was an assistant professor of economics and international affairs at the George Washington University from 1994 to 2001 and a lecturer in the department of economics at the Princeton University from 1993 to 1994.

== Education ==
He obtained his PhD in economics from the Princeton University in 1995, M.A. in economics from the Johns Hopkins University in 1989 and B.A. (Honours) in Economics from St. Stephen's College, University of Delhi in 1986. He did his schooling in Modern School, Barakhamba Road, New Delhi.

== Research interest ==
- Development Economics
- Political Economy
- Applied Microeconomic Theory

== Publications ==
- Jain, Sanjay (August 1999). "Symbiosis vs. crowding-out: the interaction of formal and informal credit markets in developing countries". Journal of Development Economics. 59 (2): 419–444. doi:10.1016/S0304-3878(99)00019-X.
- Jain, Sanjay; Mansuri, Ghazala (October 2003). "A little at a time: the use of regularly scheduled repayments in microfinance programs". Journal of Development Economics. 72 (1): 253–279. doi:10.1016/S0304-3878(03)00076-2.
- Jain, Sanjay; Banerji, Arup (September 2007). "Quality dualism". Journal of Development Economics. 84 (1): 234–250. doi:10.1016/j.jdeveco.2005.09.010.
- Jain, Sanjay (December 2007). "Project assistance versus budget support: an incentive-theoretic analysis of aid conditionality". Review of World Economics. 143 (4): 694–719. doi:10.1007/s10290-007-0128-6. JSTOR 40441159. S2CID 154162854.
- Jain, Sanjay; Mukand, Sharun W. (March 2003). "Redistributive promises and the adoption of economic reform". The American Economic Review. 93 (1): 256–264. doi:10.1257/000282803321455269. JSTOR 3132172. Pdf.
- Jain, Sanjay; Mukand, Sharun W. (June 2004). "The economics of high-visibility terrorism". European Journal of Political Economy. 20 (2): 479–494. doi:10.1016/j.ejpoleco.2004.02.001.

Reprinted as: Jain, Sanjay; Mukand, Sharun W. (2007), "The economics of high-visibility terrorism", in Brück, Tilman (ed.), The economic analysis of terrorism, Routledge Studies in Defence and Peace Economics Series, London New York: Routledge, pp. 47–63, ISBN 9780415365239.

- Jain, Sanjay; Mukand, Sharun W.; Kapur, Devesh (2006), "Outsourcing and international labor mobility: a political economy analysis", in Foders, Federico; Langhammer, Rolf J. (eds.), Labor mobility and the world economy, New York: Springer, pp. 187–208, ISBN 9783540310440.
- Jain, Sanjay; Ramdas, Kamalini (September 2005). "Up or out—or stay put? Product positioning in an evolving technology environment". Production and Operations Management. 14 (3): 362–376. doi:10.1111/j.1937-5956.2005.tb00030.x.
- Jain, Sanjay; Majumdar, Sumon (March 2016). "State Capacity, Redistributive Compensation, and the Political Economy of Economic Policy Reform". International Review of Economics and Finance. 42: 462–273. doi:10.1016/j.iref.2015.10.025.
- Jain, Sanjay; Jonasson, Jonas; Pauphilet, Jean; Ramdas, Kamalini (June 2023). "Robust combination testing: methods and application to COVID-19 detection" (PDF). Management Science. 70 (4): 2661–2681. doi:10.1287/mnsc.2023.4826.
