= Military budget of China =

Military expenditure of China, Russia and U.S. in constant 2021 US$ billions

The military budget of the People's Republic of China is the portion of the overall government budget that is allocated for the funding of the People's Liberation Army. This military budget finances employee salaries and training costs, the maintenance of equipment and facilities, support of new or ongoing operations, and development and procurement of new weapons, equipment, and vehicles. Every March, as part of its annual state budget, China releases a single overall figure for national military expenditures. As of 2026, the official military budget was announced to be 1.90 trillion yuan (US$277 billion), the second largest in the world behind the US.

According to the Stockholm International Peace Research Institute, SIPRI, China was the fourth largest arms exporter in 2019–23 when it accounted for 5.8 per cent of total global arms exports. Its arms exports decreased by 5.3 per cent compared to 2014–18. The bulk of Chinese arms exports (85 per cent) went to states in Asia and Oceania, followed by states in Africa (9.9 per cent). China delivered major arms to 40 states in 2019–23, but well over half of its arms exports (61 per cent) went to just one state—Pakistan.

== Official announcements ==
Official budget
Publication date	Value (billions of US$)
March 2008	58.8
March 2009	70.0
March 2010	76.5
March 2011	90.2
March 2012	103.1
March 2013	116.2
March 2014	131.2
March 2015	142.4
March 2016	143.7
March 2017	151.4
March 2018	165.5
March 2019	177.6
May 2020	183.5
March 2021	209.4
March 2022	229.4
March 2023	235.8

The Chinese government annually announces the budget for the internal security forces and the PLA at the National People's Congress in early March.

- 2014: the budget was announced to be US$131billion.
- 2015: the budget was announced to be US$141billion. At the same time, the Chinese government estimated the Chinese economy to grow 7% in 2015.
- 2016: the budget was announced to be 954.35 billion yuan (US$147 billion), raised 6-7 % above last year's estimates.
- 2017: the budget was announced to be 1.044 trillion yuan ($151.4 billion), which is an increase of 7% over the last year.
- 2018: the budget was announced to be 1.11 trillion yuan (US$175 billion), which is an increase of 8.1% over the last year. This was China's largest defense budget raise in three years.
- 2019: the budget was announced to be 1.19 trillion yuan (US$176 billion), which is an increase of 7.5% over the last year.
- 2020: the budget was announced to be 1.27 trillion yuan (US$178 billion), which is an increase of 6.6% over the last year.
- 2021: the budget was announced to be 1.35 trillion yuan (US$209 billion), which is an increase of 6.8% over the last year.
- 2022: the budget was announced to be 1.45 trillion yuan (US$230 billion), which is an increase of 7.1% over the last year.
- 2023: the budget was announced to be 1.55 trillion yuan (US$224 billion), which is an increase of 7.2% over the last year.
- 2024: the budget was announced to be 1.67 trillion yuan (US$231 billion), which is an increase of 7.2% over the last year.
- 2025: the budget was announced to be 1.78 trillion yuan (US$246 billion), which is an increase of 7.2% over the last year.

== Unofficial estimates ==
Unofficial estimates place the total amount of military spending for China higher than the Chinese government figures, but these calculations tend to differ between organizations.

A RAND Corporation study for year 2003 estimated China's defense spending to be higher than the official number but lower than United States Department of Defense calculations. The defense spending of China was estimated, in the mid-range estimate, to be 38 billion dollars or 2.3% of China's GDP in 2003. The official figure was 22.4 billion dollars. Nevertheless, Chinese military spending doubled between 1997 and 2003, nearly reaching the level of the United Kingdom and Japan, and it continued to grow over 10% annually during 2003–2005.

In 2010, the US Department of Defense's annual report to Congress on China's military strength estimated the actual 2009 Chinese military spending at US$150 billion. Stockholm International Peace Research Institute (SIPRI) estimates that the military spending of the People's Republic of China for 2009 was US$100 billion, higher than the official budget, but lower than the US DoD estimate.

The International Institute for Strategic Studies in a 2011 report argued that if spending trends continue China will achieve military equality with the United States in 15–20 years.

Jane's Defence Forecasts in 2012 estimated that China's defense budget would increase from $119.80 billion to $238.20 billion between 2011 and 2015. This would make it larger than the defense budgets of all other major Asian nations combined. This is still smaller than the estimated United States defense budget of $525.40 billion for 2013. However, United States defense spending is slightly declining.

In 2017, the magazine Popular Mechanics estimated that China's annual military spending is greater than $200 billion, around 2% of the GDP.

In 2019, Peter Robertson, a professor from the University of Western Australia, argued that using conventional currency conversion as opposed to more accurate "purchasing power parity" (PPP) exchange rates dramatically understated China's military capabilities and that China's real military spending was equivalent to US spending of $455 billion, calculated from a PPP perspective.

In 2023, the Stockholm International Peace Research Institute estimated the China's military spending is $296 billion which accounted for 1.7% of the country total GDP.

A 2024 study by Taylor Fravel, George J. Gilboy, and Eric Heginbotham estimated China's total military spending for 2024 at US$471 billion.

== Comparison with other countries ==
Further information: List of countries with highest military expenditures

Military spending, top 25 countries by % GDP, 2024
Country	% GDP spent on military
Ukraine	34.5
Israel	8.8
Algeria	8.0
Saudi Arabia	7.3
Russia	7.1
Myanmar	6.8
Oman	5.6
Armenia	5.5
Azerbaijan	5.0
Kuwait	4.8
Jordan	4.8
Burkina Faso	4.7
Mali	4.2
Poland	4.2
Burundi	3.8
Brunei	3.6
Morocco	3.5
United States	3.4
Estonia	3.4
Colombia	3.4
Latvia	3.3
Greece	3.1
Lithuania	3.1
Chad	3.0
Kyrgyzstan	3.0

Military spending, top 25 countries by PPP, 2024
Country	$billions spent on military
United States	997
China	567
Russia	401
India	308
Ukraine	183
South Korea	96
Germany	99
Japan	91
France	91
United Kingdom	86
Brazil	64
Poland	62
Italy	60
Turkey	59
Indonesia	47
Colombia	43
Mexico	40
Spain	39
Australia	31
Canada	31
Netherlands	21
Philippines	21
Romania	21
Greece	17
Malaysia	14

== See also ==
- List of countries by military expenditures
- List of countries by number of military and paramilitary personnel
