= Think Tanks and Civil Societies Program =

Program at the University of Pennsylvania, US

- Abbreviation: TTCSP
- Formation: 1989
- Dissolved: 2021
- Headquarters: University of Pennsylvania, Philadelphia, Pennsylvania, U.S.
- Director (last): James G. McGann
- Parent organization: Lauder Institute, University of Pennsylvania
- Website: repository.upenn.edu/think_tanks/

The Think Tanks and Civil Societies Program (TTCSP) was an academic, non-profit program based in Philadelphia, Pennsylvania, that operated from 1989 to 2021. TTCSP was originally established at the Foreign Policy Research Institute (itself a think tank) in 1989; in 2008 it moved to become part of the International Relations Program and the Lauder Institute at the University of Pennsylvania. The program's director was James McGann; and at times it had hundreds of interns and staff working on its projects. The program conducted research on policy institutes around the world, published surveys, rankings and guides, and maintained a database of over 11,000 think tanks from across the world.

== History ==
TTCSP was established at the Foreign Policy Research Institute in 1989. It began with a focus on think tanks in the US. In the 1990s, the program became increasingly global, at least in part as a result of the political and economic transformation taking place in Central and Eastern Europe.

In the late 1990s, Diane Stone and Erik Johnson plus R. Kent Weaver of the Brookings Institution and James McGann of the Foreign Policy Research Institute were asked to help conceptualize what became the Global Development Network — initially a World Bank-sponsored conference in Barcelona, Spain. Diane Stone and Erik Johnson subsequently joined the World Bank Institute to help launch the GDN that subsequently grew into an Indian-headquartered international organisation focused on the global south.

In 2008, the TTCSP moved to the International Relations Program and the Lauder Institute at the University of Pennsylvania.

It was dissolved in 2021 following the death of McGann.

== Global Go To Think Tank Index ==
McGann and the TTCSP published the annual Global Go To Think Tank Index. As of 2010, the Index was based on a three-phase survey methodology somewhat similar to university rankings in the US; participants in the collation of the index and its ranking processes included think tank academic experts, politicians, political scientists, think tank donors and staff, and think tanks themselves. However, this methodology for the study, ranking and assessment of policy institutes has been criticized by researchers such as Enrique Mendizabal and Goran Buldioski, Director of the Think Tank Fund, assisted by the Open Society Institute.

In 2018, the Index listed the United States as the nation with the largest number of think tanks (1871), followed by India (509), China (507), United Kingdom (321), Argentina (227), Germany (218), Russia (215), France (203), Japan (128), Italy (114), Brazil (103), Canada (100), and South Africa (93).

In its last edition, in 2020, the Index noted that there were over 11,000 think tanks worldwide.

== See also ==
- List of think tanks
