= Tilman Brück =

German economist

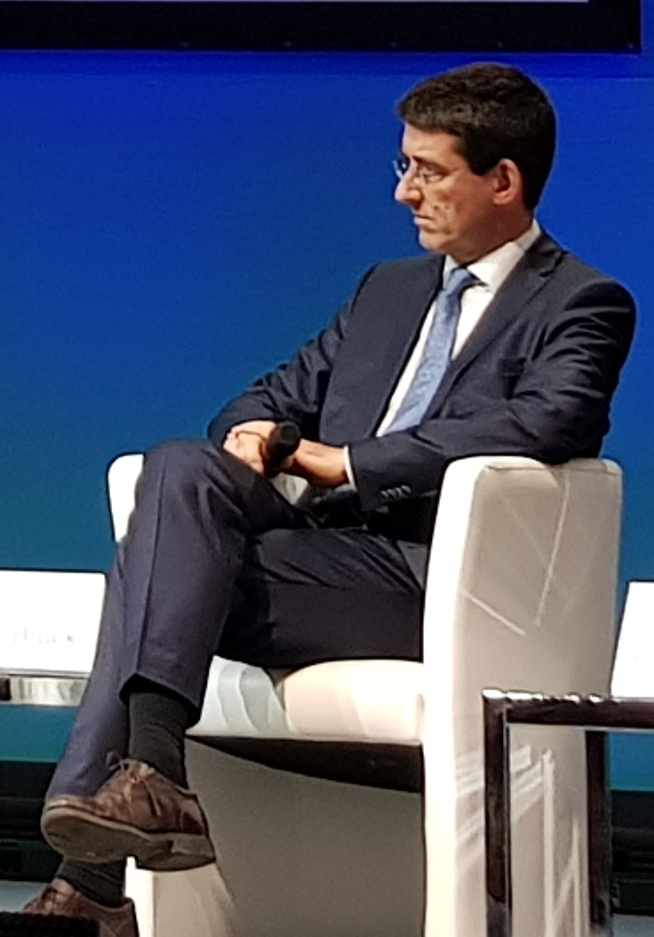
- Brück in 2018
- Born: 10 December 1970 (age 55)

Academic background
- Education: University of Oxford

Academic work
- Discipline: Development economics
- Institutions: Stockholm International Peace Research Institute
- Website: Information at IDEAS / RePEc

Notes
- Thesis Coping with peace: post-war household strategies in northern Mozambique. (2001)

Tilman Brück (born 10 December 1970) is a German economist specializing in development and the economics of peace, conflict and terrorism. He was full professor of development economics at Humboldt University of Berlin. He also headed the department of Development and Security at the German Institute for Economic Research (DIW).

Brück is an expert on the economics of developing and transition countries such as Colombia, Mozambique, Angola, Uganda, Mongolia and the countries of Central Asia. In September 2012 it was announced that he was to replace Bates Gill as head of the Stockholm International Peace Research Institute, a global think-tank dedicated to research into security, conflict and arms control. Brück took up the Director's position in January 2013 and stepped down in June 2014.

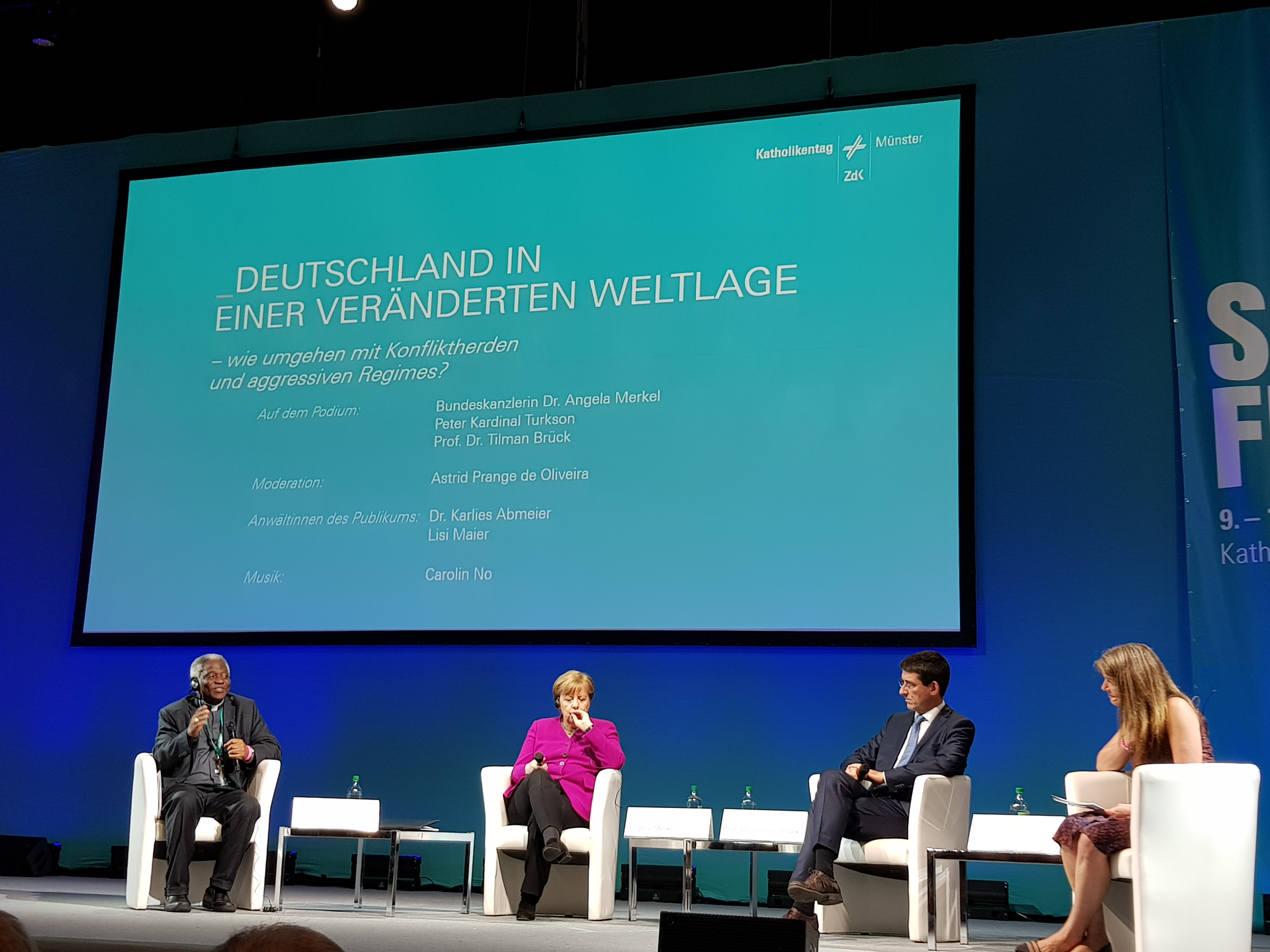
Podium discussion with Catholic Cardinal Peter Turkson, German Chancellor Angela Merkel and economist Tilman Brück at the 101st Katholikentag

== Education ==
Brück studied for masters and doctorate degrees in economics at the University of Oxford, St Cross College, between 1996 and 2001. Prior to this he studied economics at the University of Glasgow. He was also a visiting lecturer at the University of Rome, Tor Vergata. He speaks English, German and Portuguese.

== Research interests ==
Brück's research interests include the inter-relationship between peace, security and development (especially at the micro-level), the economics of post-war reconstruction, and the economics of terrorism and security policy.

== Select publications ==
=== Books ===
- Brück, Tilman (2007). The economic analysis of terrorism. Routledge Studies in Defence and Peace Economics Series. London New York: Routledge. ISBN 9780415365239.
- Brück, Tilman; Lehmann, Hartmut, eds. (2012). In the grip of transition: economic and social consequences of restructuring in Russia and Ukraine. Studies in Economic Transition Series. New York: Palgrave Macmillan. ISBN 9780230303102.
- Brück, Tilman; Justino, Patricia; Verwimp, Philip, eds. (2013). A micro-level perspective on the dynamics of conflict, violence and development. Oxford: Oxford University Press. ISBN 9780199664597.

=== Articles ===
- Brück, Tilman; van den Broeck, Katleen (2006). Growth, employment and poverty in Mozambique (PDF). Issues in Employment and Poverty Discussion Paper No. 21. Social Science Research Network. ISBN 978-9221182535. SSRN 2124924.
- Brück, Tilman; Müller, Cathérine (February 2010). "Comparing the determinants of concern about terrorism and crime" (PDF). Global Crime. 11 (1): 1–15. doi:10.1080/17440570903475634. hdl:10419/150753. S2CID 216591946.
- Brück, Tilman; et al. (6 August 2010). "Response: the time of young scientists". Science. 329 (5992): 626–627. doi:10.1126/science.329.5992.626-b. JSTOR 40799662.
- Brück, Tilman; Brzoska, Michael; Drakos, Konstantinos (April 2011). "The economics of security: a European perspective". Defence and Peace Economics. 22 (2): 99–104. doi:10.1080/10242694.2011.562003. S2CID 154346732. SSRN 2125077.
- Brück, Tilman; de Groot, Olaf J.; Schneider, Friedrich (November 2011). "The economic costs of the German participation in the Afghanistan war". Journal of Peace Research. 48 (6): 793–805. doi:10.1177/0022343311419544. S2CID 108934937.
- Brück, Tilman; Schneider, Friedrich (December 2011). "Terror and human insecurity: editorial introduction". European Journal of Political Economy. 27 (s1): S1–S4. doi:10.1016/j.ejpoleco.2011.09.002. SSRN 2124992.

== Professional Affiliations ==
- Households in Conflict Network (HiCN), co-director
- Institute of the Study of Labor, research fellow
- Stockholm International Peace Research Institute
- Global Young Academy, founding fellow
