= Lauder Institute =

Business school at the University of Pennsylvania

Coordinates: 39.9513°N 75.1939°W

- The Joseph H. Lauder Institute of Management & International Studies
- Type: Private
- Established: 1983
- Parent institution: University of Pennsylvania
- Director: Jules H. van Binsbergen
- Location: Philadelphia, Pennsylvania, U.S.
- Lauder Institute Logo

The Joseph H. Lauder Institute of Management & International Studies (The Lauder Institute) is an institution that offers a joint degree program at the University of Pennsylvania, combining an MA in international studies from the School of Arts and Sciences with an MBA from the Wharton School or a JD from the Penn Carey Law School.

The Lauder Institute was founded in 1983 by Leonard A. Lauder and Ronald S. Lauder in honor of their father, Joseph Lauder.

== Program ==
In the program, students pursue one of six programs on five regional areas, or the Global Program. Within the regional programs for a 24-month period, students learn in one of 11 languages: Arabic, Mandarin Chinese, French, German, Hindi, Italian, Japanese, Korean, Portuguese, Russian, or Spanish.
