= List of equipment of the Pakistan Army =

The following is a list of active equipment of the Pakistan Army.

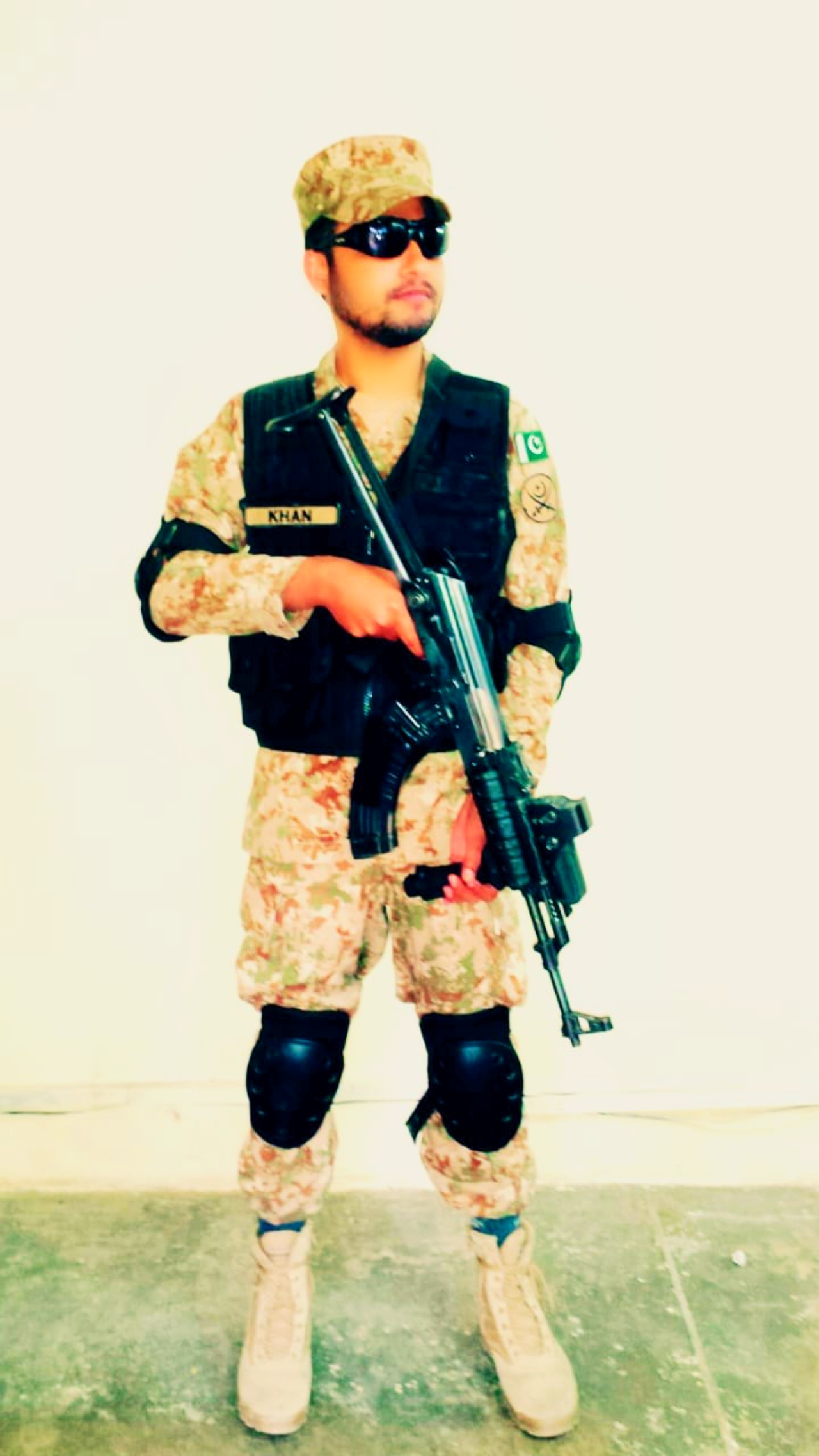
A Pakistan army soldier in a standard Semi pixelated Arid Desert pattern uniform and armed with an Type 56.

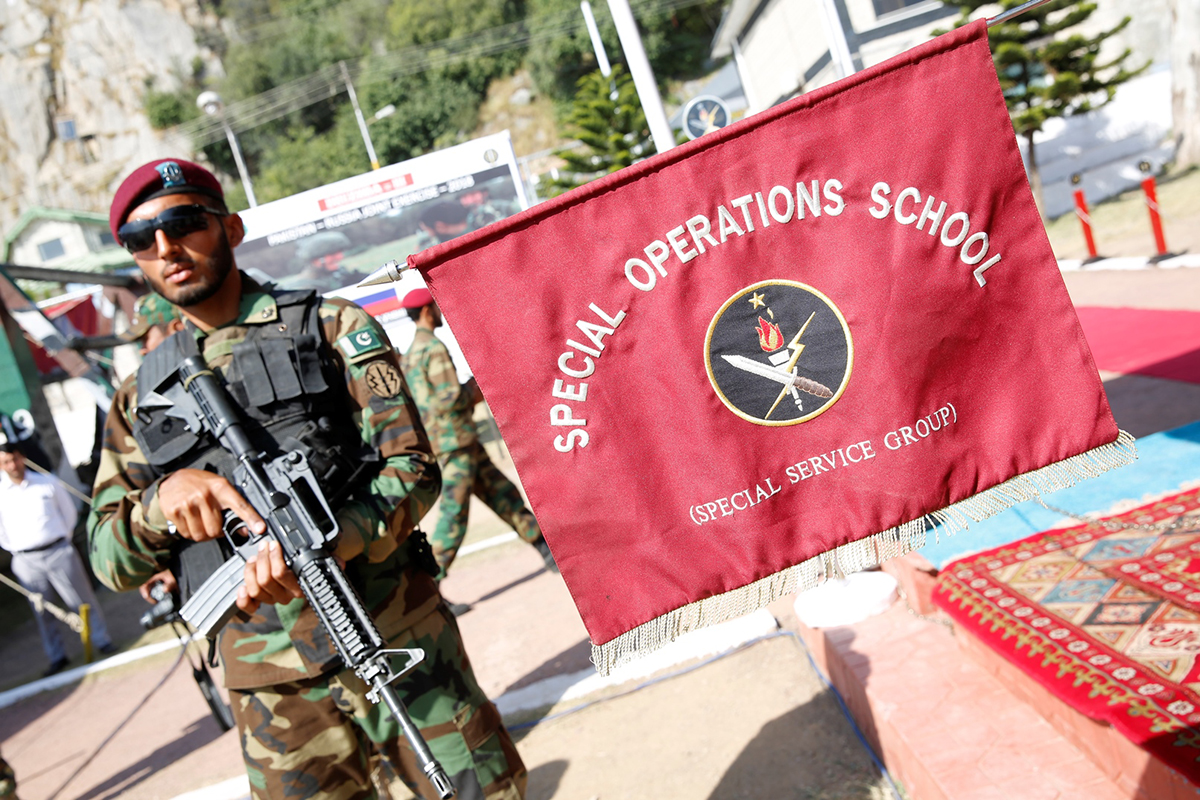
A Pakistan army SSG commando in a standard U.S. (M81) uniform, armed with an M4 carbine CQBR.

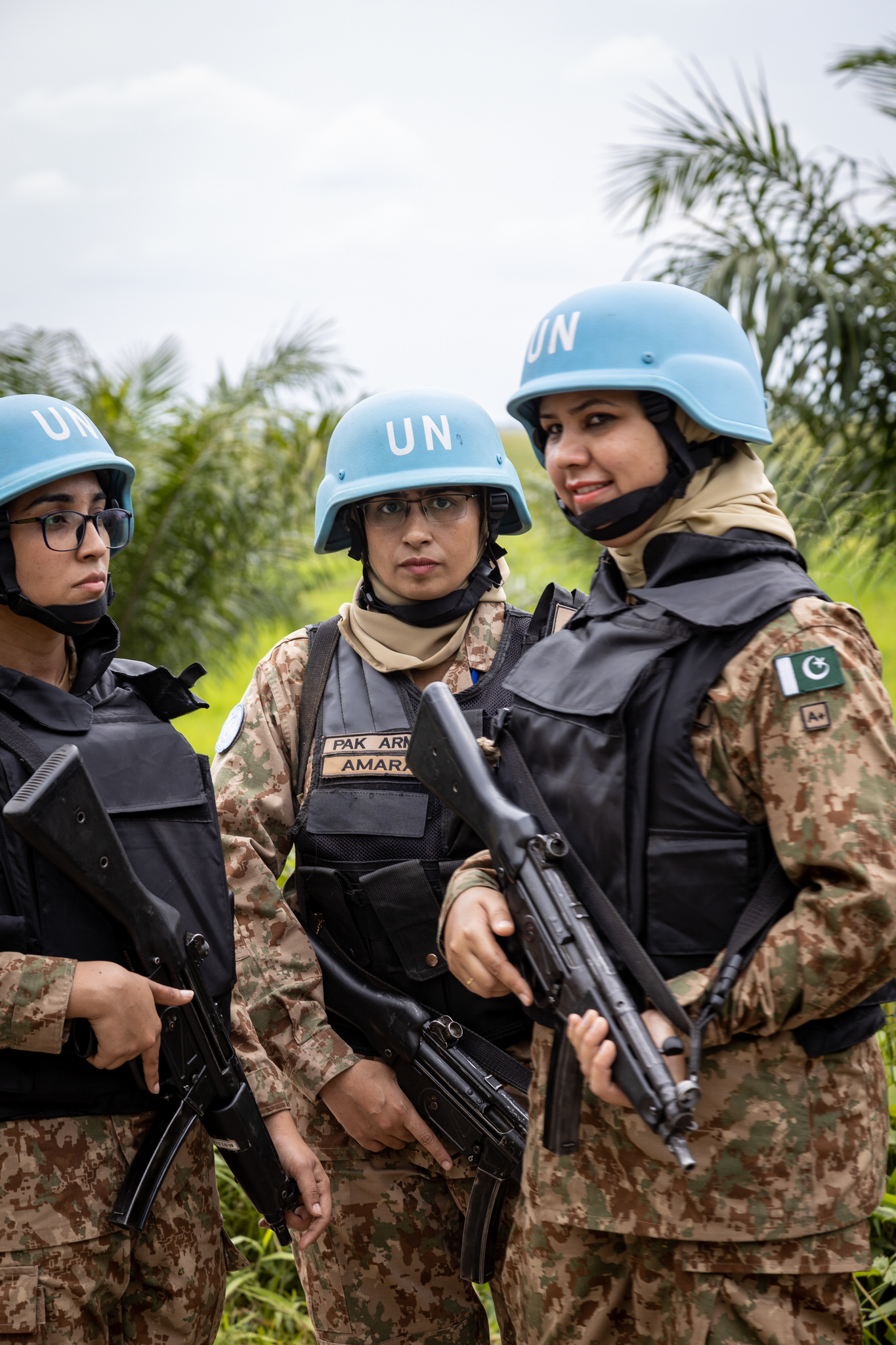
MONUSCO's Female Engagement Team in standard UCP armed with HK-MP5s.

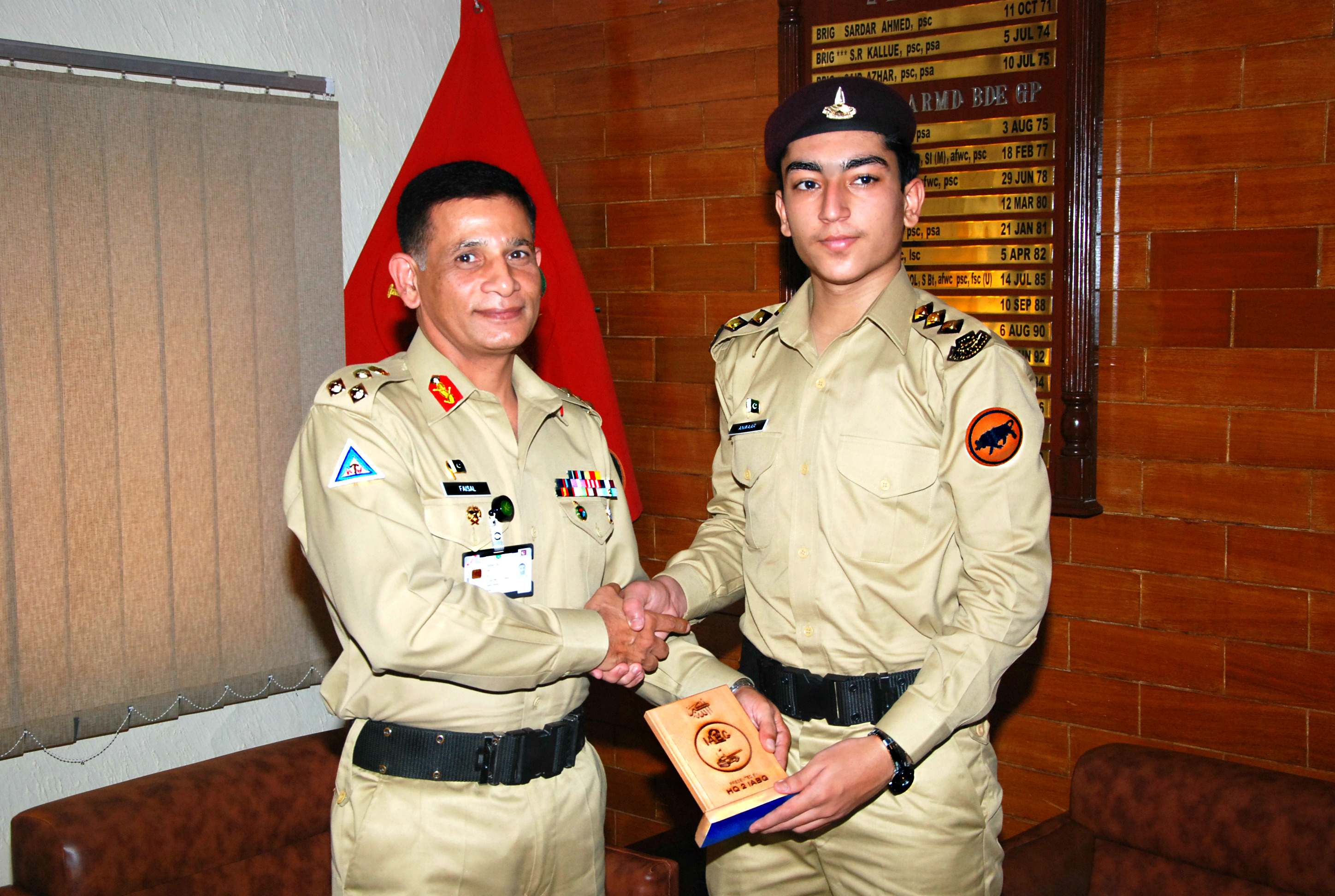
The standard army service uniform of the Pakistan Army, worn by officers and enlisted personnel

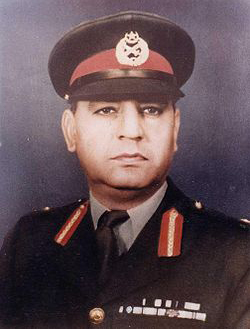
The army service uniform of the Pakistan Army closely resembled to the army uniform of the British Army as seen and active from 1947–1970s

== Infantry load-bearing equipment ==
=== Personal protective equipment (PPE) ===
Name	Image	Type	Origin	Notes
GIDS Light Weight Combat Helmet		Combat helmet	Pakistan; United States	
BH A-140/150		Combat helmet	Pakistan	
SBH 400		Combat helmet	Pakistan	
MICH		Combat helmet	United States	
ACH		Combat helmet	United States	
BK-3		Combat helmet	Croatia	
PAK-10/S10 NBC Respirator		Gas mask	Pakistan; United Kingdom	
MF-11/FMJ-05 Series		Gas mask	China	
Khaki		Uniform	Pakistan	
Semi pixelated Arid Desert pattern		Military camouflage	Pakistan	
Woodland (M81)		Military camouflage	United States	
Universal Camouflage Pattern		Military camouflage	United States	
Six-Color Desert Battle Dress Uniform		Military camouflage	United States	
PASGT		Combat helmet & Bulletproof vest	United States	
NIJ Level IIIA		Bulletproof vest	Pakistan	
Level III/IV		Bulletproof vest	Pakistan	

=== Sighting Devices ===
Name	Image	Type	Origin	Notes
Tarsier		Thermal weapon sight	Pakistan	
SKUA-LR		Thermal Bino	Pakistan	
AN/AVS-9		Night Vision Device	United States	
AN/PVS-4		Night Vision Device	United States	Also locally built.
AN/PVS-5		Night Vision Device	United States	Also locally built.
AN/PVS-7		Night Vision Device	United States	Also locally built.
AN/PVS-14		Night Vision Device	United States	
Advanced Combat Optical Gunsight		Prismatic telescopic sights	United States	
EOTech		Holographic weapon sight	United States	
Aimpoint CompM2		Red dot sight	United States	
Aimpoint CompM4		Red dot sight	United States	
AN/PEQ-2		Laser sight	United States	
AN/PEQ-15		Laser sight	United States	
ELCAN Specter		Telescopic sight	United States	
Schmidt & Bender PM II		Telescopic sight	Germany	
Hensoldt / Zeiss 4x24		Telescopic sight	Germany	
PSO-1		Telescopic sight	Russia	

== Infantry weapons ==
=== Small arms ===
Weapon	Image	Caliber	Origin	Notes
Handguns
Beretta 92		9×19mm Parabellum	Italy	Standard issued. 92F variants in use.
SIG Sauer P226		9×19mm Parabellum	Germany; Switzerland	Used by Special Service Group.
SIG Sauer P229		9×19mm Parabellum	Germany; Switzerland	Used by Special Service Group.
HK USP		9×19mm Parabellum.45 ACP	Germany	Used by Special Service Group.
HK P30		9×19mm Parabellum	Germany	Used by Special Service Group.
HK P9		9×19mm Parabellum	Germany	Used by Special Service Group.
HK P11		7.62 mm	Germany	Underwater pistol, Used by Special Service Group.
Steyr M		9×19mm Parabellum	Austria	Used by Special Service Group.
FN Five-seven		5.7×28mm	Belgium	Used by Special Service Group.
Glock 17		9×19mm Parabellum	Austria	Used by Special Service Group.
Glock 18		9×19mm Parabellum	Austria	Used by Special Service Group.
Glock 19		9×19mm Parabellum	Austria	Used by Special Service Group.
Glock 26		9×19mm Parabellum	Austria	Used by Special Service Group.
HK P7		9×19mm Parabellum	Germany	Used by Special Service Group, will be replaced by P229.
POF Eye		9×19mm Parabellum	Pakistan	CornerShot weapon system, Standard issued and used by Special Service Group.
Shotgun
Benelli M3		12-gauge	Italy	Used by Special Service Group.
Submachine guns
HK MP5		9×19mm Parabellum	Germany	MP5A2, MP5P3, MP5SD3 and SMG-PK variants in service. Under license built by POF.
HK MP5SD		9×19mm Parabellum	Germany	MP5A2, MP5P3, MP5SD3 and SMG-PK variants in service. Under license built by POF.
HK MP5K		9×19mm Parabellum	Germany	MP5A2, MP5P3, MP5SD3 and SMG-PK variants in service. Under license built by POF.
HK MP7		HK 4.6×30mm	Germany	
Colt M635		9×19mm Parabellum	United States	Used by Special Service Group.
FN P90		5.7×28mm	Belgium	Personal defence weapon.
Assault rifles, Bullpup rifles, Battle rifles & Carbines
HK G3		7.62×51mm NATO	Germany	Standard battle rifle. G3A3, G3P4 variants in service. Under license built by POF.
Type 81		7.62×39mm	China	Standard assault rifle. Variants of AKM and AK-47.
Type 56		7.62×39mm	China	Standard assault rifle. Type 56-I, II & some modernized variants in service. Variants of AKM and AK-47.
M4 carbine		5.56×45mm NATO	United States	Standard issued for the Special Service Group. M4A1 & CQBR variants in service. Also used with SOPMOD kits.
FN F2000		5.56×45mm NATO	Belgium	Used by Special Service Group.
Steyr AUG		5.56×45mm NATO	Austria	Used by Special Service Group. AUG A3, AUG HBAR variants in service.
QBZ-95		5.8×42mm	China	
SIG SG 552 Commando		5.56×45mm NATO	Switzerland	Used by Special Service Group. SG 552 variant in service.
FN SCAR		5.56×45mm NATO; 7.62×51mm NATO	Belgium; United States	Used by Special Service Group. SCAR-L & H variants in service.
M16		5.56×45mm NATO	United States	Limited use.
HK33		5.56×45mm NATO	Germany	Limited use.
AK-103		7.62×39mm	Russia	Limited use, were locally produced as PK-21 for a short period of time.
AK-74		5.45×39mm	Soviet Union	Mostly border seized.
Sniper rifles & Anti-materiel rifles
POF Azb DMR MK1		7.62×51mm NATO	Pakistan	Designated marksman rifle. Semi-automatic, based on the Heckler & Koch G3 rifle.
POF PSR-90		7.62×51mm NATO	Pakistan	Used by Special Service Group. Semi-automatic, based on the Heckler & Koch PSG1.
POF LSR		7.62×51mm NATO.308 Winchester	Pakistan	Bolt-action.
SC-76 Thunderbolt		7.62×51mm NATO	United Kingdom	Used by Special Service Group. Bolt-action.
Istiglal		12.7×108 mm 14.5×114 mm	Azerbaijan	Used by Special Service Group. Semi-automatic. Anti-materiel rifle.
SVD		7.62×54mmR	Russia	Original Russian made rifles either imported from Russia or captured from the Soviet Union during the Soviet–Afghan War, or smuggled from other countries, with Chinese made models also being in service.
Steyr SSG 69		.308 Winchester	Austria	Bolt-action.
Tikka T3x		.308 Winchester	Finland	Bolt-action.
Accuracy International Arctic Warfare		7.62×51mm NATO.308 Winchester.338 Lapua Magnum	United Kingdom	Used by Special Service Group. Bolt-action.
RPA Rangemaster		.50 BMG	United Kingdom	Used by Special Service Group. Bolt-action. Anti-materiel rifle
Barrett M82		.50 BMG	United States	Used by Special Service Group. Semi-automatic. Anti-materiel rifle
Machine guns
POF HMG PK-16		12.7×108mm	Pakistan	Standard heavy machine gun, based on the DshK/Type 54P.
MG3		7.62×51mm NATO	Germany	Standard general-purpose machine gun. Under license built by POF.
M240		7.62×51mm NATO	United States	Used by Special Service Group.
M249 SAW		5.56×45mm NATO	United States	Used by Special Service Group.
FN MAG		7.62×51mm NATO	Belgium	General-purpose machine gun.
FN Minimi		5.56×45mm NATO	Belgium	Used by Special Service Group.
M134 Minigun		7.62×51mm NATO	United States	Rotary machine gun, mostly GAU-17 variant is used with helicopters.
M2 Browning		.50 BMG	United States	Also built under license by POF.
RPD		7.62×39mm	Soviet Union	Limited usage by Special Service Group.
PKM		7.62×54mmR	Soviet Union	Limited usage by Special Service Group.
Anti-drone gun
Safrah		No physical ammunition, use of Electronic countermeasure	Pakistan	Portable electronic warfare anti-drone gun.(C-UAS)

=== Explosives, rockets, mortars and mines ===
Weapon	Image	Type	Origin	Notes
Arges 84 P2A1		Hand grenade	Austria	Fragmentation grenade. Under license built by POF.
M26		Hand grenade	United States	Fragmentation grenade.
M67		Hand grenade	United States	Fragmentation grenade.
POF WP P3 MK1		Smoke grenade	Pakistan	Smoke screening hand grenade.
POF Grenade Target Indication MK1		Smoke grenade	Pakistan	Target indication smoke hand grenade.
AGL PAK-40		Automatic grenade launcher (40×53mm)	Pakistan	
Mk 19		Automatic grenade launcher (40×53mm)	United States	
Milkor MGL		Hand-held Grenade launcher (40×46mm)	South Africa	
QLZ-87		Automatic grenade launcher (35×32mm)	China	
GP-25		Under barrel grenade launcher (40 mm)	Soviet Union	Mounts on Type 56 and other AK Variant.
M203		Under barrel grenade launcher (40 mm)	United States	Mounts on M4s and M16s.
GL-1		Under barrel grenade launcher (40 mm)	Belgium	Mounted on FN F2000.
SPG-9		Recoilless rifle	Soviet Union	73 mm recoilless rifle.
M40A1		Recoilless rifle	United States	105 mm recoilless rifle.
Carl Gustaf M2/M3		Shoulder-fired recoilless rifle	Sweden	84 mm recoilless rifle.
Type 69 RPG		Rocket grenade launcher	China	40 mm rocket-propelled grenade launcher.
RPG-7		Rocket grenade launcher	Soviet Union	40 mm rocket-propelled grenade launcher.
RPG-29		Rocket grenade launcher	Soviet Union	105 mm rocket-propelled grenade launcher.
Mk 153 SMAW		Anti-armor Rocket launcher	United States	80 mm Smoothbore rocket launcher. Used by Special Service Group.
Alcotán-100		Anti-tank Rocket launcher	Spain	100 mm disposable anti-tank rocket launcher, Alcotán-AT (M2) variant in service. Equipped with Vosel (M2) fire control system.
Type 63-1		Mortar launcher	China; United States	60 mm mortar. Based on M2 variant in service.
LLR 81		Mortar launcher	Spain; France	81 mm mortar. MO-81-61C and MO-81-61L variants in service.
MO-120-RT		Mortar launcher	Spain; France	120 mm mortar in service. Previous Mortar Brandt AM-50 delivered by France between 1976 and 1985 after a 1965 purchase, with a total of 225 mortar delivered.
POF P3 Mk2		Anti-tank mine	Pakistan	
POF P4 Mk1		Anti-personnel mine	Pakistan	
POF Amman 2000 Mk1		Anti-personnel mine	Pakistan	
POF Amman 2000 Mk2		Anti-personnel mine	Pakistan	
POF P5 Mk1		Command-detonated anti-personnel mine	Pakistan	Based on M18A1 Claymore.

== Land vehicles ==
=== Main battle tanks ===
Name	Image	Origin	In service	Notes
Haider		Pakistan	176+	Total 679 planned.
VT-4		China	176+	Total 679 planned.
Al-Khalid I		Pakistan	110	
Al-Khalid		Pakistan	300	
Al-Zarrar		Pakistan	500	
T-80UD		Ukraine	350	
Type-85-IIAP		China	268-300	Some source estimate around 400 in service.
Type-69		China	400	Some in reserve.
Type-59		China	600	
T-55H		Soviet Union	282	282 T-55H modernized tanks delivered from Serbia in 2020.
T-54/T-55		Soviet Union	54 (in reserve)	100 T-54s and 100 T-55s delivered from Soviet Union in 1968-69.
M48 Patton		United States	300 (in reserve)	300 M48A5s retired from active service in 2002, currently in reserve.

=== Armoured combat vehicles ===
Name	Image	Origin	In service	Notes
Armoured personnel carriers and Infantry fighting vehicles
HIT APC Saad/Talha		Pakistan	2,000	Tracked multirole armoured personnel carrier and infantry fighting vehicle. Based on M-113
HIT Dragoon 2		Pakistan	600	4x4 multirole armoured fighting vehicle. Based on Dragoon 300.
HIT Liger		Pakistan	—	4x4 multirole armoured fighting vehicle armed with Zarb RCWS.
HIT Faaris		Pakistan	—	6x6 multirole armoured fighting vehicle. Based on VN22.
HIT Mohafiz		Pakistan	—	Light armoured security vehicle.
Cavelier Interceptor Mk-II		Pakistan	—	4x4 armoured security vehicle.
Cavelier Predator SOV		Pakistan	—	4x4 special operations vehicle.
Cougar 2 LAMV		Pakistan; United Arab Emirates	—	4x4 armoured security vehicle, STREIT Group Cougar (Light Armoured Multipurpose Vehicle) locally built.
M113		United States	M113 A1/A2/P: 2,300	Multirole armoured personnel carrier and infantry fighting vehicle. Mostly modernized & upgraded, American built M113A1/A2, Pakistani built M113P and Italian built VCC-1A2 variants in service.
M113		United States	VCC-1/VCC-2: 600	Multirole armoured personnel carrier and infantry fighting vehicle. Mostly modernized & upgraded, American built M113A1/A2, Pakistani built M113P and Italian built VCC-1A2 variants in service.
HMMWV/Humvee		United States	—	Limited number in service. Some captured from Taliban.
Textron Commando		United States; Canada	~400	Modernized M1117 Guardian armoured security vehicle.
Otokar Akrep		Turkey	1,800	Armoured infantry mobility vehicle.
Otokar Cobra		Turkey	800	Armoured infantry mobility vehicle.
Aibar		Kazakhstan; Turkey	—	4x4 multirole armoured fighting vehicle, Otokar Cobra II variant.
Taimas		Kazakhstan; Turkey	—	6x6 & 8x8 multirole armoured fighting vehicle, Otokar Arma variant.
Puma		Italy	80	6x6 armoured fighting vehicle.
Iveco VM 90		Italy	2,200	Multirole armoured fighting vehicle.
Steyr-Puch Pinzgauer		Austria	—	Limited number in service.
Al-Fahd		Saudi Arabia	1,000	Multirole armoured fighting vehicle.
UR-416		Germany	45	Armoured personnel carrier.
Type 63		China	100	Armoured personnel carrier.
WZ-551/Type 92		China	—	Armoured infantry fighting vehicle.
Dongfeng Mengshi CSK-182		China	300	Armoured infantry mobility vehicle.
Lazar 2		Serbia	23	Armoured personnel carrier.
BTR-70		Soviet Union	120	Amphibious armoured personnel carrier.
BTR-80		Soviet Union	120	Amphibious armoured personnel carrier.
Mine-resistant ambush-protected
Cavalier Hamza		Pakistan	—	6x6.
International MaxxPro		United States	525	4x4. MaxxPro DXM and MaxxPro Dash DXM variants in service.
BMC Kirpi		Turkey	100+	4x4.
First Win		Thailand	—	100 First Win vehicles ordered after the signing of MoU with Thailand in 2024. Induction started in 2026.
Casspir		South Africa	150	Limited number in service.
Fire support vehicles
HIT Maaz		Pakistan	500	Anti-tank variant based on APC Talha, using Baktar Shikan
HIT Mouz		Pakistan	—	Air defence variant based on APC Talha, using RBS-70
HIT Sakb		Pakistan	700	Armoured command and control vehicle. Based on APC Talha
M901 ITV		United States	50	Anti-tank missile carrier based on M113, armed with BGM-71 TOW.
Unmanned ground vehicles
Robot wolf		China	—	AI driven Quadruped robot designed for identity checks, surveillance, and engagement.
Haider-e-Karrar		Pakistan	—	Tracked high-mobility combat and support platform armed with RCWS, manufactured by NRTC.
Platforma-M		Russia	—	Armed with RPG-26 and Kalashnikov heavy machine gun variants.

=== Engineering and support vehicles ===
Name	Image	Origin	In service	Notes
HIT Al Hadeed		Pakistan	—	Medium armoured recovery vehicle based on APC Saad
W653		China	175	Medium armoured recovery vehicle. Based on Type 69 tank.
M88		United States	52	Heavy armoured recovery vehicle. Based on Patton family of tanks. M88 & M88A1 variants in service.
Isoli M60		Italy	500	Light recovery crane mounted on truck.
Dragon		Pakistan	—	Tank-mounted engineering mine plough vehicle.
Troll Anti-Mine		Pakistan	53	De-mining vehicle. Based on T-55 tank.
Aardvark JSFU		United Kingdom	—	Mine flail vehicle. Mk 3 variant in service.
Type 84 RDMS		China	14	Air-dispersed anti-tank mine.
HIT Al Khalid AVLB		Pakistan	8	Armoured vehicle-launched bridge. Based on Al Khalid tank.
M60 AVLB		United States	12	Armoured vehicle-launched bridge. Based on M60 tank. M60A1 variant in service.
M47M AVLB		United States	—	Armoured vehicle-launched bridge. Based on M47 tank.
M48A2 AVLB		United States	—	Armoured vehicle-launched bridge. Based on M48 tank.
AM 50B		Slovakia	4	Bridge layer.
PB 79A		Pakistan	—	Pontoon bridge.
Mine-resistant ambush-protected
MaxxPro MRV		United States	40	Light armoured recovery vehicle. Based on MaxxPro.
Cougar JERRV		United States	20	Mine-clearing vehicle. Buffalo Explosive Ordnance Disposal version.
Unmanned ground vehicles
G-Rover Tactical		Pakistan	—	Surveillance and tactical UGV manufactured by Integrated Dynamics.
Unnamed UGV		Pakistan	—	EOD/HAZMAT support system for Pakistan army's Bomb disposal units, manufactured by NRTC.

=== Transporter Erector Launcher vehicles for missiles and MLRS ===
Name	Image	Origin	Suspension	Notes
Mercedes-Benz Atego		Germany	4x4 wheeled (without trailer)	Mounts missile systems like Ghauri-I and Ghauri-II.
MAZ-7310		Soviet Union; Belarus	8x8 wheeled	Mounts missile systems like Abdali-I and Shaheen-I.
A-100		China	8x8 wheeled	Mounts MLRS and missile systems.
TAS5380		China	8x8 wheeled	Mounts HQ-9P and HQ-11.
TAS5450		China	8x8 wheeled	Mounts MLRS and missile systems from Fatah series and LY-80 (HQ-16).
WS-1/WS-2		China	8x8 wheeled	Mounts MLRS and missile systems like Nasr.
WS2400		China	8x8 wheeled	Mounts Ghaznavi.
WS2500		China	10x10 wheeled	Mounts Babur (cruise missile) and Zarb.
MAZ-547A		Soviet Union; Belarus	12x12 wheeled	Mounts missile systems like Shaheen-II.
WS21200		China	16x16 wheeled	Mounts Shaheen-III, Ababeel and other in Hatf series.

=== Goods & troops transport vehicles ===
Name	Image	Origin	Notes
Isuzu F-Series		Japan	Light/Medium truck. Various variants in service.
Hino Ranger		Japan	Light/Medium truck. Various variants in service.
RMMV TG MIL		Austria; Germany	TGM variant in service.
Mercedes-Benz Unimog		Germany	U4000/U5000. Light/Medium truck. Highly off-road-capable.
Mercedes-Benz 1017A		Germany	Light/Medium truck.
M35		United States	Light/Medium truck. Various variants in service.
HIT Al Qaswa		Pakistan	Light armored tracked vehicle for logistics & cargo. Based on the M113 APC.
Yasoob		Pakistan	Medium/Heavy truck. Limited numbers in service.

=== Light utility vehicles ===
Name	Image	Origin	Notes
Foton Tunland		China	Primarily used as a technical for multirole purposes.
Toyota Hilux		Japan	Primarily used as a technical for multirole purposes. Seventh generation and Eighth generation in service.
Toyota Land Cruiser		Japan	Primarily used as a technical for guarding posts.
Land Rover Defender		United Kingdom	Primarily used as a technical for guarding posts.

== Artillery ==
=== Rocket artillery ===
Name		Image	Origin	In service	Notes
Rocket artillery
Fatah Series	Fatah-1		Pakistan	Unknown	Guided MLRS. Maximum range of 140 km.
Fatah Series	Fatah-2		Pakistan	Unknown	Guided MLRS. Maximum range of 400 km.
A-100E			China	450+	300 mm MLRS. Based on the BM-30 Smerch. The system can launch CALT-built rocket having maximum range of 120 km.
Ghazab			Pakistan	Unknown	122 mm MLRS. Based on the BM-21 Grad. The system can launch POF built Yarmuk Rocket having maximum range of 40 km+.
PHL-81 "Azar"			China	52+	122 mm MLRS. Chinese variant of the BM-21 Grad. Locally designated as the "Azar", having maximum range of 40 km.

=== Self-propelled artillery ===
Name	Image	Origin	In service	Notes
SH-15		China; Pakistan	300	155 mm truck-mounted howitzer. Pakistan has ordered around 236–300 more units, further these howitzers will be locally produced under ToT by HIT.
SH-1		China	~90	PLL01 (Chinese variant of the GC-45) 155 mm howitzer, mounted on WS5252 6x6.
M109		United States	438	155 mm tracked howitzer. M109A2: (200); M109A5: (115); M109L: (123)
M110		United States	60	203 mm tracked howitzer. M110A2 variant in service.

=== Towed artillery ===
Name	Image	Origin	In service	Notes
M115		United States	28	203 mm howitzer.
M198		United States	148	155 mm howitzer.
M114A2		United States	144	155 mm howitzer.
M59		United States	300	155 mm howitzer.
Panter		Turkey	72	155 mm howitzer.
Type 59-1		China	410	130 mm howitzer. Based on M-46.
Type 86		China	80	122 mm howitzer. Based on D-30A.
Type 54-1		China	490	122 mm howitzer. Based on M-30.
M-56		United States	113	105 mm howitzer.
M101A1		United States	216	105 mm howitzer.
25-pounder Mk.IV		United Kingdom	1,000	Still in service as of 2018. 88 mm shells being produced by POF.

== Missile systems & Air defense ==
=== Cruise Missiles ===
Name		Image	Origin	Notes
Babur 1	Babur-IA		Pakistan	Land based Cruise missile. Maximum range of 450 km
Babur 1	Babur-IB		Pakistan	Land based Cruise missile. Maximum range of 900 km
Babur 2			Pakistan	Land based Cruise missile. Maximum range of 750 km
Zarb			Pakistan	Land based Cruise missile. Maximum range of 300 km
Fatah Series	Fatah-3		Pakistan	Land based Supersonic Cruise missile developed from HD-1.
Fatah Series	Fatah-4		Pakistan	Land based Subsonic Cruise missile. Maximum range of 750 km.
Fatah Series	Fatah-5		Pakistan	Land based Subsonic Cruise missile. Maximum range of 1000 km.

=== Anti-tank guided missiles ===
Weapon	Image	Type	Origin	Notes
Kornet-E		Laser-guided anti-tank missile	Russia	52 launchers purchased in 2017-2018 along with unspecified number of missiles.
HJ-8		Wire-guided anti-tank missile	China	Locally produced under license by GIDS, designated as "Baktar-Shikan". Used with Maaz, 4x4 vehicles and AH-1F Cobra. Range of 4 km. According to SIPRI, between 1990 and 2022, Pakistan has produced 26,350 Baktar-Shikans.
BGM-71 TOW		Wire-guided anti-tank missile	United States	TOW-2A, TOW-2A RF, TOW-2B RF and ITOW variants in service. Used with M901 ITV, M113 APC and AH-1F Cobra.
MILAN		Wire-guided anti-tank missile	Germany	Used by Special Service Group.
NESCOM Barq-I/II		Air-launched anti-tank missile	Pakistan	Used on Helicopters & UAVs.
AGM-114 Hellfire		Air-launched anti-tank missile	United States	Used on upgraded AH-1F Cobra.
CM-502KG		Air-launched anti-tank missile	China	Used on Z-10.
9M119 Svir/Refleks		Air-launched anti-tank missile	Soviet Union	1,920 9M119 received from Belarus by 1999 to be used on its T-80UD.

=== Air-to-air missile ===
Weapon	Image	Type	Origin	Notes
TY-90		Air-to-air missile	China	Used on Z-10.

=== Air Defence ===
Weapon	Image	Type	Origin	Notes
Air defence - Missile systems
HQ-7		Short-range surface-to-air missile	China	FM-90 variant in service. Operational range is 15 km.
HQ-11		Short-to medium-range surface-to-air missile	China	Operational range against aircraft: 30 km. Operational range against missiles: 20 km.
HQ-16		Short-to medium-range surface-to-air missile	China	Two variants in service: LY-80: Operational range is 40 km. LY-80EV: Operational range is 70 km.
HQ-9		Medium-to long-range surface-to-air missile	China	HQ-9P variant in service. Operational range is 125 km against aircraft and 25 km against cruise missiles.
Air defence - Man-portable systems
GIDS Anza		Man-portable air-defense system	Pakistan	Three variants in service: Anza Mk-I (Based on HN-5B. A total of 1,100 in service. 100 delivered by 1987. 1,000 produced between 1989 and 1998.); Anza Mk-II (Based on QW-1. 2,650 produced between 1994 and 2022.); Anza Mk-III (Based on QW-2. Unknown number in service.)
RBS 70		Man-portable air-defense system	Sweden	Laser Beam riding guidance, Mk 1, Mk 2, Mk 2 BOLIDE variants in service. 1,711 missiles. RBS 70 VLM used with M113 and Mouz APC.
FN-6 / FN-16		Man-portable air-defense system	China	806 FN-6 delivered between 2010 and 2016. 1,191 FN-16 delivered between 2018 and 2021.
FIM-92 Stinger		Man-portable air-defense system	United States	FIM-92A variant in service.
Air defence - Close-in weapon system - (C-UAS)
Type 625E		Hybrid gun-missile systems, SHORAD	China	Export version of PLB-625, armed with 6-barrel 25 mm Gatling gun and eight FB-10A or FN-16 short-range missiles, mounted on an off-road capable 8x8 truck chassis.
ASELSAN ŞAHİN		Anti drone hard-kill system	Turkey	40mm remote-controlled physical neutralization system uses programmable ATOM airburst ammunition for short-range drone defense.
Air defence - Counter-Unmanned Aerial System (C-UAS)
HIT P-905		Interceptor drones	Pakistan	Counter-UAV solution pairs the OR-503 radar system with the I-402 interceptor drone for kinetic hard-kill capabilities.
GIDS Spider		Electronic jammer	Pakistan	Mobile and portable Counter-UAV (C-UAS) platform featuring a 10 km range, integrated electro-optical tracking, wideband RF jamming (400 MHz–6 GHz), and tactical GNSS spoofing capabilities.
Air defence - Anti-aircraft gun systems
Type 85		Anti-aircraft gun (12.7mm)	China	Updated version of Type 77.
Type 54P		Anti-aircraft gun (12.7mm)	China	Chinese version of DShK, locally produced under license by POF.
KPV heavy machine gun		Anti-aircraft gun (14.5mm)	Soviet Union	
Type 56 / Type 58		Anti-aircraft gun (14.5mm)	China	200, Based on ZPU.
Oerlikon GDF		Anti-aircraft gun (2 x 35 mm)	Switzerland	248, GDF-002 and GDF-005 variants in service, with 134 SkyGuard radar units. Capable of C-UAS roles.
Type 55 / Type 65		Anti-aircraft gun (37 mm)	China	310, Based on M1939.
L-60		Anti-aircraft gun (40 mm)	Sweden	50 units as of 2021.
Type 59		Anti-aircraft gun (57 mm)	China	144 units as of 2021, based on AZP S-60.

== Radars ==
=== Air Radars ===
Name	Image	Type	Origin	Notes
IBIS-150		Air surveillance radar	China	Used with LY-80.
LAADS		Air surveillance radar	United States	
Giraffe 40		Command and control Early warning radar	Sweden	
SLC-2		AESA counter-battery radar	China	
RASIT		Ground surveillance radar	France	RASIT-E variant in service.
Skyguard		Fire control radar	Switzerland	Used with Oerlikon GDF.
Firefinder		Weapon-locating radar	United States	

== Aircraft munition (missiles excluded) ==
Used on helicopters of Pakistan Army Aviation Corps
Name	Image	Type	Origin	Notes
Autocannons
M197 Gatling gun		Rotary cannon	United States	Used on the AH-1 Cobras.
M134 Minigun/GAU-17		Rotary cannon	United States	Used on the AH-1 Cobras, Bell 412 and Bell Hueys.
GSh-23V		Twin-barrel Autocannon	Soviet Union	Used on the Mi-35.
PX-10A		Revolver cannon	China	Used on the Z-10s.
FN HMP250		Heavy machine gun pod	Belgium	Used on Eurocopter Fennecs and Eurocopter AS350 Écureuil.
FN HMP400		Heavy machine gun pod	Belgium	Used on Eurocopter Fennecs and Eurocopter AS350 Écureuil.
UPK-23		Twin-barrel gun pod	Soviet Union	Used on the Mi-17.
Grenade launchers
M129		Automatic grenade launcher	United States	Used on the AH-1 Cobras.
Guided and unguided Rockets
S-8		Unguided rockets	Soviet Union	Used on the Mi-17 and Mi-35. Also indiginously built as Yarmuk.
B-8V20		Unguided rockets	Soviet Union	Used on the Mi-17.
S-13		Unguided rockets	Soviet Union	Used on the Mi-35.
Hydra 70		Unguided rockets	United States	Used on the AH-1 Cobra.
SNEB		Unguided rockets	France	Used on the SA 330 Puma. Also locally built.
FS-70B		Guided aerial blast fragmentation rockets	China	Used on the Z-10.
FZ-90		Unguided rockets	Belgium	Used on Eurocopter Fennecs and Eurocopter AS350 Écureuil.
FZ275 LGR		Laser guided rockets	Belgium	Used on Eurocopter Fennecs and Eurocopter AS350 Écureuil.

== Aircraft ==
Aircraft/System	Photo	Origin	Role	Variant	Quantity	Note	Service period
Helicopters
Mil Mi-17		Russia	SAR; Utility; Transport	Mi-171 Mi-17-1V Mi-171Sh Mi-17V-5	48	Replaced the Mi-8T	1996–present
Changhe Z-10		China	Attack	Z-10ME	4-8	Total 40 ordered	2025–present
Bell AH-1 Cobra		United States	Attack	AH-1F	50	Modernized & upgraded. To be replaced by the Changhe Z-10ME	1985–present
Eurocopter AS350 Écureuil		France	Attack, Utility	AS350	4		2006–present
Eurocopter Fennec		France	Attack	AS550 C3	35		2009–present
Mil Mi-35		Russia	Attack	Mi-35M3	4		2018–present
Aérospatiale/IAR SA 330 Puma		France	SAR; Utility; Transport	SA 330L	43		1977–present
IAR 330 Puma		Romania	SAR; Utility; Transport	SA 330L	4		1984–present
Aérospatiale Alouette III		France	Light Utility	SA 316B	13		1967–present
Aérospatiale Lama		France	Light Utility	SA 315B	17		1986–present
AgustaWestland AW139		Italy	SAR; Utility; Transport	AW139M	7	Also used as VIP transport.	2017–present
Bell UH-1 Iroquois		United States	Liaison; Utility	UH-1H	1	Out of the total 18, only one is in service.	1970s
Bell 412		United States	Liaison; Utility	412EP	31		2004–present
Bell 206 JetRanger		United States	Trainer	206B	18		1975–present
Enstrom F-28		United States	Trainer	280FX	19		2018–present
Schweizer 300		United States	Trainer	300C	25		1993–present
Fixed-wing aircraft
PAC MFI-17 Mushshak		Sweden; Pakistan	Trainer	License built Saab MFI-17 Supporter	214		
Harbin Y-12		China	Utility	Y-12(II)/F	4		
Beechcraft Super King Air		United States	Reconnaissance	350i	3	SIGINT & ISR	
Beechcraft Super King Air		United States	Transport	350ER	6		
Turbo Commander		United States	Utility	690C	2		
Cessna 208 Caravan		United States	MEDEVAC; Utility	208B	13		
Cessna 206 Stationair		United States	MEDEVAC	T206H	4		
Cessna Citation II		United States	VIP Transport	Citation Bravo	1		
Cessna Citation V		United States	VIP Transport	Citation Ultra	1		
Bombardier Challenger 605		Canada	VIP Transport	CL-605	1		
Gulfstream IV		United States	VIP Transport	G450	1		
Gulfstream G600		United States	VIP Transport	G600	1		
Unmanned aerial vehicles
CH-4 Rainbow		China	Unmanned combat aerial vehicle	CH-4B	N/A		
NESCOM Burraq		Pakistan	Unmanned combat aerial vehicle		N/A		2013–present
GIDS Shahpar-l		Pakistan	Unmanned combat aerial vehicle		N/A		
GIDS Shahpar-II		Pakistana	Unmanned combat aerial vehicle		N/A		
GIDS Uqab		Pakistan	Unmanned combat aerial vehicle		N/A		2010–present
GIDS Sarkash		Pakistan	One-way attack drone, Loitering munition		N/A		
GIDS Blaze Family (25/50/75)		Pakistan	Loitering munition		N/A		
Yalghar-200		Pakistan	Loitering munition		N/A		
SATUMA Salaar		Pakistan	Miniature UAV		N/A		
RQ-11 Raven		United States	Miniature UAV	Raven B	85		

- In 2015 the Pakistan Army ordered 12 Bell AH-1Z Viper attack helicopters, with an option of 3 more to replace its ageing AH-1F Cobras and were to be delivered by 2017. Following cancellation of $300 million military aid to Pakistan by the US government in 2018, the helicopters were put into storage at Davis-Monthan AFB, Arizona. The reasoning for this cancellation by Trump was due Pakistan's support for groups like Lashkar-e-Tayyiba. In 2020 Pakistan considered ditching the Bell AH-1Z Viper deal for either Turkish or Chinese helicopters. By 2022 Pakistan fully ditched this deal for Turkish T129B ATAK and Chinese Z-10ME Helicopters. The 12 Bell AH-1Z Vipers which were meant for Pakistan, are now planned to be sold to Ukraine instead as of 2024.
- 3 Changhe Z-10ME attack helicopters of China were delivered for trial use so that orders could be made in the future.
- In 2018, following trials, Pakistan ordered 30 T129B ATAK helicopters from TAI. Following US reluctance to grant Turkey the necessary export licenses for the LHTEC CTS800-4A engines, Pakistan extended the delivery deadline by one year.

== Retired equipment ==
=== Infantry weapons ===
Weapon	Image	Caliber	Origin	Notes
Handguns
Webley Revolver		.45 ACP	United Kingdom	
Type 54		7.62×25mm Tokarev	China	Copy of the TT-33 Tokarev.
Walther P38		9×19mm Parabellum	Germany	
Walther PP		.22 long rifle	Germany	
ČZ vz. 27		.32 ACP	Czechoslovakia	
Smith & Wesson Model 10		.38 Long Colt	United States	
Wembley Bull Dog revolver		.442 Webley	United Kingdom	
Submachine guns
Sterling L2A1		9×19mm Parabellum	United Kingdom	
Sten		9×19mm Parabellum	United Kingdom	
M3 Grease Gun		9×19mm Parabellum	United States	
Battle rifles
M1 carbine		.30 carbine	United States	
M1 Garand		.30-06 Springfield	United States	
Lee–Enfield		.303 British	United Kingdom	
FN FAL		7.62×51mm NATO	Belgium	
Machine Guns
M1918 Browning		.30-06 Springfield	United States	
M1919 Browning		7.62×51mm NATO	United States	
Bren		.303 British	United Kingdom	
Vickers		.303 British	United Kingdom	
Weapon	Image	Type	Origin	Notes
Grenades
Mk-II Mills Bomb		Fragmentation grenade	United Kingdom	
Land mines
MON-50		Anti-personnel mine	Soviet Union	
Rocket Launchers
M20 Super Bazooka		Anti-tank rocket launcher	United States	
Other Explosives
Bangalore torpedo		Demolition charge	British India	
Molotov cocktail		Incendiary weapon	Finland	

=== Air Defense ===
Weapon	Image	Caliber	Origin	Notes
Anti aircraft guns
QF 3.7-inch		94 mm	United Kingdom	
Weapon	Image	Type	Origin	Notes
Surface-to-air missiles
HQ-2/SA-2		High Altitude Air Defense system	China	
HN-5B		MANPAD	China	
9K32 Strela-2		MANPAD	Soviet Union	
FIM-43 Redeye		MANPAD	United States	

=== Artillery ===
Weapon	Image	Caliber	Origin	Notes
BL 5.5-inch		140 mm	United Kingdom	
D-74/Type 60		122 mm	China	
OTO Melara Mod 56		105 mm	Italy	
Type 56		85 mm	China	
Ordnance QF 6-pounder		57 mm	United Kingdom	

=== Tank destroyer ===
Name	Image	Quantity	Origin	Notes
M36		75	United States	M36B2.

=== Main battle tank ===
Name	Image	Quantity	Origin	Notes
M47 Patton		150	United States	M47M Patton II.
M24 Chaffee		132	United States	
M4 Sherman		514	United States	162 Sherman II and Sherman V & 352 M4A1E6.
M5 Stuart		—	United States	
Type 63		80	China	Amphibious Light tank.
PT-76		44	Soviet Union	Amphibious Light tank. 12 captured Indian tanks.
AMX-13/75		—	France	Captured Indian tanks.

=== Armoured personnel carriers ===
Name	Image	Quantity	Origin	Notes
Universal Carrier		—	United Kingdom	
M9 half-track		—	United States	
M3 half-track		—	United States	
OT-64 SKOT		6	Czechoslovakia; Poland	

=== Armoured scout cars ===
Name	Image	Quantity	Origin	Notes
Daimler Ferret		10	United Kingdom	
BRDM-2		—	Soviet Union	

=== Light utility vehicle ===
Name	Image	Origin	Notes
M151		United States	
Willys M38A1		United States	
Willys MB		United States	

=== Aircraft ===
Aircraft	Image	Quantity	Origin	Acquired	Retired	Notes
Fixed-wing aircraft
Auster 5		—	United Kingdom	1947	1957	
Auster AOP.6		—	United Kingdom	1947	1957	
Cessna O-1 Bird Dog		60	United States	1957	1990	
Beechcraft U-8F Seminole		—	United States	1963	1983	
Helicopters
Bell H-13 Sioux		18	United States	1964	1990	
Bell 47G		18	United States	1964	1990	
Agusta-Bell AB 205A		10	Italy; United States	1974	—	
Mil Mi-4		2	Soviet Union	1965	1966	Were temporarily borrowed during war time.
Mil Mi-6		1	Soviet Union	1968	1968	Sole Mi-6 flown by Pakistan Air Force for the Army Aviation Corp, until its crash during an evaluation flight on 27 July 1968.
Mil Mi-8		12	Soviet Union	1969	1998	

== See also ==
- List of equipment of the Pakistan Air Force
- List of equipment of the Pakistan Navy
- List of formations of the Pakistan Army
