= List of active Pakistan Air Force aircraft =

Below is a list of aircraft currently in active service with the Pakistan Air Force.

== List ==
Aircraft	Manufacturer	Image	Origin	Class	Role	Introduced	Variants	In service	Total (acquired)	Notes
Combat Aircraft
J-35 Cloud Dragon	Shenyang Aircraft Corporation		China	Jet	Stealth multirole	2026–2027 (Expected)	J-35AE	0	0	40 on order.
J-10 Vigorous Dragon	Chengdu Aerospace Corporation		China	Jet	Multirole	11 March 2022	J-10CE	20	20	16 on order.
JF-17 Thunder	Pakistan Aeronautical Complex / Chengdu Aerospace Corporation		Pakistan, China	Jet	Multirole	18 February 2010	(50) JF-17 Block 1	175	180	8 JF-17 Block 3 on order. All Block 1 and Block 2 being upgraded to Block 3 standards.
JF-17 Thunder	Pakistan Aeronautical Complex / Chengdu Aerospace Corporation		Pakistan, China	Jet	Multirole	18 February 2010	(62) JF-17 Block 2	175	180	8 JF-17 Block 3 on order. All Block 1 and Block 2 being upgraded to Block 3 standards.
JF-17 Thunder	Pakistan Aeronautical Complex / Chengdu Aerospace Corporation		Pakistan, China	Jet	Multirole	18 February 2010	(26) JF-17B Block 2	175	180	8 JF-17 Block 3 on order. All Block 1 and Block 2 being upgraded to Block 3 standards.
JF-17 Thunder	Pakistan Aeronautical Complex / Chengdu Aerospace Corporation		Pakistan, China	Jet	Multirole	18 February 2010	(42) JF-17 Block 3	175	180	8 JF-17 Block 3 on order. All Block 1 and Block 2 being upgraded to Block 3 standards.
F-16 Fighting Falcon	General Dynamics / Lockheed Martin		United States	Jet	Multirole	15 January 1983	(31) F-16A MLU	75	85	
F-16 Fighting Falcon	General Dynamics / Lockheed Martin		United States	Jet	Multirole	15 January 1983	(9) F-16A ADF	75	85	
F-16 Fighting Falcon	General Dynamics / Lockheed Martin		United States	Jet	Multirole	15 January 1983	(23) F-16B MLU	75	85	
F-16 Fighting Falcon	General Dynamics / Lockheed Martin		United States	Jet	Multirole	15 January 1983	(4) F-16B ADF	75	85	
F-16 Fighting Falcon	General Dynamics / Lockheed Martin		United States	Jet	Multirole	15 January 1983	(12) F-16C Block 52	75	85	
F-16 Fighting Falcon	General Dynamics / Lockheed Martin		United States	Jet	Multirole	15 January 1983	(6) F-16D Block 52	75	85	
Mirage III	Dassault Aviation		France	Jet	Multirole	1968	(2) Mirage IIIB	49	135	Phasing Out. Some upgraded by Project ROSE.
Mirage III	Dassault Aviation		France	Jet	Multirole	1968	(7) Mirage IIIOD	49	135	Phasing Out. Some upgraded by Project ROSE.
Mirage III	Dassault Aviation		France	Jet	Multirole	1968	(30) Mirage IIIEP	49	135	Phasing Out. Some upgraded by Project ROSE.
Mirage III	Dassault Aviation		France	Jet	Multirole	1968	(10) Mirage IIIRP	49	135	Phasing Out. Some upgraded by Project ROSE.
Mirage 5	Dassault Aviation		France	Jet	Attack	1970	(25) Mirage 5PA/5PA2	37	139	Phasing Out. Some upgraded by Project ROSE
Mirage 5	Dassault Aviation		France	Jet	Attack	1970	(2) Mirage 5PDA/5PDA2	37	139	Phasing Out. Some upgraded by Project ROSE
Mirage 5	Dassault Aviation		France	Jet	Attack	1970	(10) Mirage 5PA3	37	139	Phasing Out. Some upgraded by Project ROSE
F-7PG	Chengdu Aerospace Corporation		China	Jet	Interceptor	2002	F-7PG	53	60	Phasing Out.
Trainer Aircraft
K-8	Hongdu / Pakistan Aeronautical Complex		Pakistan, China	Jet	Intermediate Jet Trainer	1994	(12) K-8	58	60	Produced under license by PAC, designated as Karakorum-8 (K-8).
K-8	Hongdu / Pakistan Aeronautical Complex		Pakistan, China	Jet	Intermediate Jet Trainer	1994	(48) K-8P	58	60	Produced under license by PAC, designated as Karakorum-8 (K-8).
T-37 Tweet	Cessna		United States	Jet	Basic Jet Trainer	1962	T-37B/C	69	73	Older aircraft to be eventually replaced with K-8Ps.
MFI-17 Mushshak	Pakistan Aeronautical Complex		Pakistan, Sweden	Turboprop	Primary Trainer	1974	(115) MFI-17 Mushshak	145	151	Licensed Saab Supporter. Some MFI-17 Mushshaks being upgraded to Super Mushshak standard.
MFI-17 Mushshak	Pakistan Aeronautical Complex		Pakistan, Sweden	Turboprop	Primary Trainer	1974	(30) Super Mushshak	145	151	Licensed Saab Supporter. Some MFI-17 Mushshaks being upgraded to Super Mushshak standard.
Strategic Airlift Transporter/Aerial Refueling Aircraft
Il-78	Ilyushin		Russia	Jet	Strategic Airlift Transporter/Aerial Refueler	2009	Il-78MP	4	4	Dual-role aerial refeulers and freighters. Ex-Ukrainian Air Force.
Transport Aircraft
C-130 Hercules	Lockheed Martin		United States	Turboprop	Medium transport /Tactical airlift	1963	(5) C-130B	21	25	7 purchased second-hand from Belgium.
C-130 Hercules	Lockheed Martin		United States	Turboprop	Medium transport /Tactical airlift	1963	(9) C-130E	21	25	7 purchased second-hand from Belgium.
C-130 Hercules	Lockheed Martin		United States	Turboprop	Medium transport /Tactical airlift	1963	(7) C-130H	21	25	7 purchased second-hand from Belgium.
L-100 Hercules	Lockheed Martin		United States	Turboprop	Medium transport /Tactical airlift		L-100-20	1	2	
Saab 2000	Saab		Sweden	Turboprop	Medium utility	2008		6	6	
CN-235	CASA / Indonesian Aerospace	A twin-engine CASA CN-235 transport aircraft in flight.	Spain, Indonesia	Turboprop	Medium utility		CN235M-220	4	4	
Y-12	Harbin Aircraft Industry Group		China	Turboprop	Light transport	1993	Y-12(II)	3	3	
Super King Air	Beechcraft		United States	Turboprop	Light transport		King Air 350i	2	2	
208 Caravan	Cessna		United States	Turboprop	Light utility		208B	2	2	
Piper M-Class	Piper Aircraft		United States	Turboprop	Light utility		M600	2	2	
Vision SF50	Cirrus Design Corporation		United States	Jet	Light utility	2026	G2	2	2	At least two visually documented in 2026 with the Reg. (V-4113 & V-4114).
172 Skyhawk	Cessna		United States	Turboprop	Light utility		172N	4	4	
A319	Airbus		France	Jet	Multirole (Peronnel transport, ISR, HADR, SIGINT/ELINT	July 2022	A319-112	1	1	
Embraer Lineage 1000	Embraer		Brazil	Jet	Personnel transport	2026	Lineage 1000	1	1	One of the three aircraft of Pakistan Naval Air Arm temporarily transferred.
Gulfstream IV	Gulfstream Aerospace		United States	Jet	Personnel transport	December 2005	Gulfstream IV-SP	3	3	
Citation Excel	Cessna		United States	Jet	Personnel transport		560XL	2	2	
Falcon 20	Dassault Aviation		France	Jet	Personnel transport		20E	1	1	
Phenom 100	Embraer		Brazil	Jet	Light personnel transport	2009	Phenom 100E	6	6	
Airborne Early Warning & Control Aircraft
Saab 2000	Saab		Sweden	Turboprop	AEW&C	2011	Saab 2000 Erieye	9	10	Saab 2000 equipped with the Saab Erieye AEW&C system.
KJ-500	Shaanxi Aircraft Corporation		China	Turboprop	AEW&C	2026–2027 (Expected)	KJ-500A	0	0	4 on order.
Electronic Warfare Aircraft
Y-8	Shaanxi Aircraft Corporation		China	Turboprop	Stand-Off Jammer / Electronic Warfare (EW)	2011	Y-8GX3	4	4	Originally inducted as the ZDK-03 Karakoram Eagle AEW&C platform. Reassigned and undergoing active structural modernization to the Chinese Y-8GX3 (High New 3) standard for offensive stand-off jamming, ESM, and ECM operations. All primary AWACS roles have been handed over to the Saab 2000 Erieye fleet.
Hava SOJ	Turkish Aerospace Industries / Aselsan		Turkey / Canada	Jet	Stand-Off Jammer / Electronic Warfare (EW)	2025		1	1	Advanced airborne remote electronic support and electronic attack standoff jamming system integrated onto a modified Bombardier Global 6000 business jet platform. Co-developed and customized by Turkish Aerospace Industries (TAI) and Aselsan to neutralize enemy air defense radars and communication links.
Falcon 20	Dassault Aviation		France	Jet	EW, ESM, ECM	1986	DA-20F	3	3	Modified EW version of the Dassault Falcon 20 business jet.
Unmanned Combat Aerial Vehicles / Unmanned Aerial Vehicles
Shahpar	Global Industrial Defence Solutions		Pakistan	UAV	Reconnaissance	2012		6	6	
Shahpar-II	Global Industrial Defence Solutions		Pakistan	MALE UCAV, UAV	Strike, Reconnaissance	2021		12+	12+	
Shahpar-III	Global Industrial Defence Solutions		Pakistan	MALE, UCAV, UAV	Strike, Reconnaissance	2026		Unknown	Unknown	Being integrated as of 2026.
Uqab-II	Global Industrial Defence Solutions		Pakistan	Tactical UAV	Reconnaissance, Target Acquisition	2011		40+	40+	
Sarkash	Global Industrial Defence Solutions		Pakistan	Loitering munition, One-way attack drone, UAV	Strike	2024		Unknown	Unknown	
Blaze Series	Global Industrial Defence Solutions		Pakistan	Loitering munition	Tactical strike drone	2024		Unknown	Unknown	
Burraq	NESCOM		Pakistan	MALE, UCAV, UAV	Strike, Reconnaissance	2014		13	13	Used jointly with Pakistan Army.
Jasoos II	SATUMA		Pakistan	UAV	Reconnaissance	2010		46	46	Also Known as Bravo+.
Falco	Pakistan Aeronautical Complex / Selex ES		Italy	UAV	Reconnaissance	2007		26	26	Produced under license by Pakistan Aeronautical Complex since 2008 with technology transfer to Pakistan.
Anka-S	NESCOM / Turkish Aerospace Industries		Turkey	MALE, UCAV	Strike, Reconnaissance	2021		24	24	Contract signed between TAI and NESCOM in August 2021 for local production of Anka UCAVs with technology transfer to Pakistan.
Bayraktar Akıncı	Baykar		Turkey	HALE, UCAV, UAV	Strike, Reconnaissance	2023		7	7	
Bayraktar TB2	Baykar		Turkey	MALE, UCAV, UAV	Strike, Reconnaissance	2022		24	24	
Baykar K2	Baykar		Turkey	Loitering munition, UAV	Strike	2026		Unknown	Unknown	
YIHA-III	Baykar		Turkey	Loitering munition, UAV	Strike	2024		Unknown	Unknown	
Asisguard Songar	Asisguard		Turkey	Quadcopter / UCAV	Strike, Reconnaissance	2025		850	850	
Wing Loong I	Chengdu Aircraft Industry Group		China	MALE, UCAV, UAV	Strike, Reconnaissance	2016		3+	3+	
Wing Loong II	Pakistan Aeronautical Complex / Chengdu Aircraft Industry Group		Pakistan / China	MALE / UCAV	Strike, Reconnaissance	2021		50	50	Co-production agreement signed for 48 strike-capable airframes to be partially assembled at PAC Kamra. Delivery and local integration phases extending through late 2026.
CH-4 Rainbow	China Aerospace Science and Technology Corporation		China	MALE, UCAV, UAV	Strike, Reconnaissance	2021	CH-4A	24	24	
CH-4 Rainbow	China Aerospace Science and Technology Corporation		China	MALE, UCAV, UAV	Strike, Reconnaissance	2021	CH-4B	24	24	
Helicopters
Mi-17	Mil Moscow Helicopter Plant		Russia	Helicopter	CSAR, Utility	2002	Mi-171Sh	40	40	
AW139	AgustaWestland		Italy	Helicopter	SAR, Utility	2018	AW139M	14	14	
H125	Airbus Helicopters		France	Helicopter	SAR, Utility	2026		1	1	First Pakistan Air Force H125 with Reg. No. 26-001 photographed in public in March 2026.

== See also ==
- List of retired Pakistan Air Force aircraft
- List of Pakistan Air Force squadrons
- List of Pakistan Air Force non-flying equipment
- Pakistan Army Aviation Corps
- Pakistan Naval Air Arm
