= List of military equipment manufactured in Pakistan =

This article is a collection of military equipment manufactured in Pakistan.

== Small arms and light weapons ==
=== Rifles ===
==== Assault rifles and carbines ====
- G-3 (POF)
- BW-20 (POF)
- BW-21 (POF)
- CW-39 (POF)
- CW-56 (POF)
- Klass786 (GIDS)
- Maverick-22 (Cavalier Group)
- CR-53 (DaudSons Armoury)
- CR-56 (DaudSons Armoury)
- PK-18 (POF)
- PK-21 (POF)

==== Sniper rifles ====
- Azb DMR MK1 - 7.62×51mm NATO semi-automatic Designated marksman rifle/sniper rifle
- Light Sniper Rifle - 7.62×51mm NATO bolt-action sniper rifle
- PSR-90 - 7.62 mm calibre sniper rifle, a variant of the HK MSG-90, produced under license

=== Machine guns ===
==== General purpose machine guns ====
- Rheinmetall MG 3 - 7.62 mm calibre general purpose machine gun, produced under license
- Type 54 - 12.7 mm machine gun, produced under license.
- HMG PK-16 - 12.7×108mm Heavy machine gun

==== Submachine guns ====
- HK MP5 - 9 mm calibre sub-machine gun produced under license. Variants produced:
  - MP5P3
  - MP5P4
  - MP5P5

=== Handguns ===
- POF PK-9 - 9 mm calibre pistol
- POF PK-10
- POF PKL-30 - 7.62×25 mm calibre pistol

=== Special purpose ===
- POF Eye - Special-purpose hand-held weapon system similar in concept to the CornerShot

== Land systems ==
=== Main battle tanks (MBTs) ===
- Al-Haider
- Al-Khalid
- Al-Khalid 1
- Al-Khalid 2
- Al-Zarrar

=== Infantry fighting vehicles (IFVs) ===
- Viper IFV
- Al-Hamza IFV
- Talha 1 IFV
- Faaris IFV

=== Armored personnel carriers (APCs) ===
- Talha APC
- Talha 1 APC
- Talha LEA APC
- Raad APC
- Saad APC
- Dragoon 300
- Dragon 2
- Faaris APC

=== Mine-resistant ambush protected vehicles (MRAPs) ===
- Hamza 6×6
- Hamza 8×8
- Hisaar

=== Infantry mobility vehicles (IMVs) ===
- Mohafiz
- Mohafiz 1
- Mohafiz 2
- Mohafiz 3
- Mohafiz 4
- Mohafiz 5
- Uqaab
- Interceptor
- Predator SOV
- Cougar
- LMAV (Streit Group Cougar)

=== Self-propelled artillery (SPG) ===
- T-MAGS (under development)

=== Towed artillery (TA) ===
- Indigenous artillery (under development by HIT)

=== Multiple launch rocket Systems (MLRS) ===
- Fatah-1
- Fatah-2
- Fatah-3
- KRL-Ghazab
- A100ME
- Azar

== Air systems ==
=== Military aircraft ===
==== Fighter aircraft ====
- JF-17 Thunder
- JF-17 Bravo
- JF-17 ALPHA (under development)
- PAC PFX (under development)

==== Trainers ====
- PAC Super Mushshak
- MFI-17 Mushshak
- K-8 Karakorum

=== Unmanned aerial vehicles (UAVs) ===
- NESCOM Burraq - Combat drone developed by NESCOM
- Selex ES Falco - Co-produced Selex Galileo built under license at PAC
- GIDS Shahpar - developed by GIDS.
- GIDS Shahpar-II - Upgraded variant of GIDS SHAHPAR by GIDS
- GIDS Shahpar-III
- GIDS Uqab
- SATUMA Jasoos, developed by SATUMA.
- Mukhbar (Short Range Reconnaissance Drone), developed by SATUMA.
- YIHA-III - developed jointly by Baykar and NASTP

== Naval systems ==
=== Surface ships ===
==== Frigates ====
- Zulfiqar Class
- Jinnah Class

==== Corvettes ====
- Babur Class

==== Mine countermeasure vessel ====
- Munsif Class

==== Fast attack crafts ====
- Azmat Class

==== Multi-purpose patrol craft ====
- Jalalat II-class
- Jurrat class

==== Auxiliary vessels ====
- PNS Moawin – Fleet tanker
- PNS Kalmat and PNS Gwader - Coastal tankers
- PNS Madadgar and PNS Rasadgar - Small tanker and utility ships

=== Submarines ===
- Agosta 90B Class
- Hangor Class
