= Safrah =

Anti-drone device

- Type: Portable anti-drone weapon
- Place of origin: Pakistan

Service history
- In service: 2025–present
- Used by: See Operators
- Wars: War on Terror; Insurgency in Khyber Pakhtunkhwa

Production history
- Designer: National Electronics Complex of Pakistan (NECOP)
- Designed: Unknown
- Manufacturer: Global Industrial Defence Solutions
- Variants: Safrah; Safrah-IIS

Specifications
- Mass: 9 kg (20 lb)
- Length: 110 cm (43 in)
- Width: 14 cm (5.5 in)
- Height: 27 cm (11 in)
- Effective firing range: 1.5 km (0.93 mi)

The SAFRAH (or Sufra; Urdu: سفرہ) is a portable electronic warfare anti-drone gun designed by the National Electronics Complex of Pakistan (NECOP) and marketed internationally by GIDS. It is designed to disrupt small and medium sized UAVs, loitering munition by jamming their communication and satellite navigation systems with an electromagnetic pulse.

== History ==
The Safrah Drone Jamming Gun, often shortened as SDJG, was designed and developed by NECOP, a government R&D facility of Pakistan. Since its development the weapon system has been operationalized with various Law Enforcement Agencies and Security Forces of Pakistan. It has also since been displayed at various defence exhibitions including EDEX Expo and PIMEC. The gun can either seize control of an incoming drone and force-land it, or render both the drone and its remote control inoperable.

=== Operational history ===
The SAFRAH was first used by Pakistani security forces in combat missions at the Afghan-Pakistan border against Afghan militant drones with effective results.

== Variants ==
- SAFRAH: Standard variant.
- SAFRAH-IIS: Upgraded version which offers a portable, tripod-mounted design optimized for frontline deployment, improved performance characteristics amongst other improvements.

== Operators ==
=== Current operators ===
- Pakistan
  - Pakistan Armed Forces
  - Khyber Pakhtunkhwa Police

=== Future operators ===
The Safrah has been evaluated by various unnamed African countries with potential acquisitions expected soon.

=== Non-state actors ===
- Ittehad-ul-Mujahideen: Claimed to have captured some units from Bannu Police. Their serviceability is unknown.

== See also ==
- Drone warfare
- GIDS Spider
