= List of equipment of the Pakistan Navy =

This is an organized list of equipment of the Pakistan Navy. It also includes the equipment of the Marines and SSGN.

== Guns ==
Gun	Image	Type	Origin	Notes
Naval artillery guns
Oto Melara 76 mm gun		Naval Gun (76.2 mm)	Italy	Super Rapid in service. Installed on Babur-class corvettes.
PJ-26		Naval Gun (76 mm)	China	Installed on Tughril-class frigates and Zulfiquar-class frigate. Chinese variant of AK-176.
Anti-aircraft gun
Type 85		Anti-aircraft gun (12.7 mm)	China	Installed onboard vessels.
Type 90 (PG99)		Anti-aircraft gun (35 mm)	Switzerland; China	Licensed copy of Oerlikon GDF-002. Used by the Marines for coastal defences.
Type 55		Anti-aircraft gun (37 mm)	China	Used mainly for ceremonial purposes.
Close-in weapon systems
GOKDENIZ		Close-in weapon system	Turkey	Installed on Babur-class corvettes.
Phalanx		Close-in weapon system	USA	On replenishment tankers like PNS Moawin (A39), PNS Nasr, Oliver Hazard Perry class frigates and Yarmook-class corvette
Type 730B		Close-in weapon system	China	Installed on Tughril-class frigate, Zulfiquar-class frigates and Azmat-class fast attack crafts.
Type 1130 Golden Shield		Close-in weapon system	China	Installed on Tughril-class frigate, Zulfiquar-class frigates and Azmat-class fast attack crafts.
H/PJ-13		Close-in weapon system	Soviet UnionChina	Installed on the Azmat-class fast attack craft.
Remote controlled weapon stations
SMASH 200/25 STOP		Remote controlled weapon stations	Turkey	Installed on Babur-class corvette.
SMASH 200/30		Remote controlled weapon stations	Turkey	Installed on Yarmook-class corvette.
STAMP		Remote controlled weapon stations	Turkey	Installed on Yarmook-class corvette.

== Munitions ==
Munition	Image	Type	Origin	Quantity	Notes
Air-to-surface missiles
AM-39		ALCM	France	40	Used by Westland Sea Kings and P-3C Orions.
AGM-84		ALCM	USA	~50	Used by P-3C Orions.
Taimoor		Stealth ALCM	Pakistan	N/A	Air launch platform not disclosed.
CM-501GA		Air-to-surface missile	China	N/A	Used by Harbin Z-9.
Surface-to-air missiles
CAMM-ER		Surface-to-air missile	UK; Italy	75	Installed on the new Babur-class corvettes.
FM-90N		Surface-to-air missile	China	400	Installed on Zulfiquar-class frigates.
LY-60N		Surface-to-air missile	China	N/A	Limited use. Formerly installed on Tariq-class destroyers.
LY-80N		Surface-to-air missile	China	N/A	Installed on Tughril-class frigates.
Anza		MANPAD	Pakistan	N/A	In service with SSGN.
Mistral		MANPAD	France	100	In service with coastal defense units.
Surface-to-surface missile
Babur-3		SLCM	Pakistan	N/A	Submarine launched nuclear capable missile.
Harbah		Anti-ship missile	Pakistan	N/A	Used by Azmat-class fast attack craft and other warships
CM-302		Supersonic anti-ship missile	China	N/A	Installed on Tughril-class frigates.
C-802A		Anti-ship missile	China	100	Installed on Zulfiquar-class frigate.
YJ-18E		SLCM	China	N/A	Used by Hangor-class submarine.
CM-708UNB		SLCM	China	N/A	Used by Hangor-class submarine.
SM-39		SLCM	France	25	Used by Khalid-class submarine.
RGM-84		Anti-ship missile	USA	~50	
UGM-84L		SLCM	USA	N/A	
RIM-66 Standard		Anti-ship missile	USA	N/A	Installed onboard PNS Alamgir.
C-602		Anti-ship cruise missile	China	120	Used by coastal defense units.
Zarb		Anti-ship cruise missile	Pakistan	N/A	Used by coastal defense units.
SY-I Silkworm		Anti-ship missile	China	30	Limited use. (Possibly retired)
P282 SMASH		Ship-borne ASBM	Pakistan	N/A	First tested in 2024.
Anti-submarine rockets
Type 87 240 mm		Anti-submarine rockets	China	N/A	Installed on Tughril-class frigate.
RDC-32		Anti-submarine rockets	Soviet Union	N/A	Installed on Zulfiquar-class frigates.
Torpedoes
A244-S		Torpedo	Italy	12	Used by Khalid-class submarine.
F-17P Mod 2		Torpedo	France	100	Used by Hashmat class submarines.
DM2A4		Torpedo	Germany	60	Used by Khalid-class submarine.
Yu-7		Torpedo	China	N/A	Used by Tughril-class frigate and Zulfiquar-class frigate.
Mark-46		Torpedo	USA	100	Used by Khalid-class submarine.
Mark 32		Torpedo tube	USA	N/A	Used on Babur-class corvette.
Eghraaq		Torpedo	Pakistan	N/A	
Mines
Starfish		Mine	Pakistan	N/A	
Stonefish		Mine	UK	N/A	Used by Khalid-class submarine.

== Infantry weapons ==
Model	Image	Origin	Variant	Caliber	Details
Assault/Battle rifles & Carbines
HK G3		West Germany; Pakistan	G3A3 & G3P4	7.62x51mm NATO	Standard issue rifle.
M4 Carbine		United States	M4A1	5.56x45mm NATO	Standard firearm for the SSGN.
SIG-516		United States; Switzerland	SIG-516PDW	5.56x45mm NATO	
SIG SG 552		Switzerland	SG 552 Commando	5.56x45mm NATO	
Steyr AUG		Austria	AUG-A1	5.56×45mm NATO	Used by SSGN.
Type 56		China	Type 56-II	7.62×39mm	Standard issue assault rifle for the Marines.
CW39		Pakistan		7.62×39mm	New standard issue assault rifle for the Marines. Replacement for the Type 56.
Machine guns
Rheinmetall MG3		West Germany; Pakistan	MG3	7.62x51mm NATO	Standard issue machine gun.
FN Minimi		Belgium		5.56x45m NATO 7.62x51mm NATO	Used by SSGN.
M249 SAW		United States Belgium	M249 SAW Para	5.56x45m NATO	
PK-16		Pakistan		12.7×108mm	
M2 Browning		United States	M2HB	.50 BMG	
Sniper rifles & Anti-materiel rifles
SVD Dragunov		Soviet Union	Dragunov	7.62x54mmR	
POF PSR-90M		West Germany; Pakistan		7.62x51mm NATO	Used by SSGN.
Light Sniper Rifle (LSR)		Pakistan		.308 Winchester 7.62x51mm NATO	
Truvelo CMS .308/.338		South Africa		7.62x51mm NATO.50 BMG	Used by SSGN.
Accuracy International Arctic Warfare		United Kingdom	Accuracy International AW	7.62x51mm NATO	Used by SSGN.
SC-76/86 Thunderbolt		United Kingdom		7.62x51mm NATO	Used by SSGN.
Barret M82		United States	M82A1	.50 BMG	Used by SSGN.
Submachine guns
HK MP5		West Germany; Pakistan	A2/A3/SD/K	9x19mm Parabellum	Standard issue SMG.
FN P90		Belgium	P90	9x19mm Parabellum	Used by SSGN.
Handguns
Glock		Austria	Glock 17 Gen.4	9x19mm Parabellum	Used with Micro RONI conversion kits.
Beretta 92FS		Italy	Beretta 92FS	9x19mm Parabellum	Standard Issued and used by SSGN.
Browning Hi-Power		United States; Belgium	Mark II, Mark III	9x19mm Parabellum	Used by SSGN.
Webley		United Kingdom	N/A	.45ACP	Limited use. Formerly issued to officers.
Grenade launchers
M203		United States	M203	40x46mm	Used by SSGN.
Rocket Launchers
RPG-7		Soviet Union		40 mm	Used by SSGN.
Mk 153 SMAW		United States		83.5 mm	Used by SSGN.

== See also ==
- CH-4 UAV
- YJ-18E
- List of equipment of the Pakistan Air Force
- List of equipment of the Pakistan Army
