= Barq (disambiguation) =

Barq is a Pakistani missile.

Barq may also refer to:

- Shafiqur Rahman Barq (born 1930), Indian politician
- Barq's, American soft drink brand
