= GIDS Shahpar-III =

Pakistani unmanned combat aerial vehicle

Shahpar-III

General information
- Type: UCAV
- Role: Strike/ISR
- National origin: Pakistan
- Manufacturer: GIDS
- Designer: NESCOM

History
- Introduction date: November 2024
- First flight: 2023
- Predecessors: GIDS Shahpar-2

The Shahpar-III is a medium-altitude long-endurance (MALE) unmanned combat aerial vehicle (UCAV) designed by NESCOM and marketed by GIDS. It is the third and newest (as of 2025) member of the Shahpar drone family and is designed as a contender to similar systems like the MQ-9 Reaper.

== Development ==
The Shahpar-III being part of the GIDS Shahpar family is a further result of Pakistan's ongoing effort to enhance its local defence industry, particularly in aerospace. Shahpar-III's existence was revealed in a future roadmap presented by GIDS on its website where it was categorized as a group-4+ UCAV. Over time, GIDS displayed models and technology demonstrators of it in various international defense exhibitions including IDEF-2023. Its development cost around a US$100 million.

During the IDEAS-24 expo in November 2024, GIDS CEO Asad Kamal and Pakistan Army chief General Asim Munir unveiled the Shahpar-III marking its first public appearance. It was classified by GIDS as a Group-4+ UCAV and reportedly developed to compete with similar drones of its category like the MQ-9 Reaper.

The Shahpar-III features domestic flight control systems and avionics and is equipped with a 1553 architecture dual-redundant flight control computer enhancing its reliability. Being a UCAV, it can be deployed in a variety of roles with ISR, ISTAR, CAS and maritime roles among them. It can be armed with several Pakistani-sourced munitions like the Barq missiles and Al Battaar laser-guided bombs though other munitions can also be integrated onto it.

== Operators ==
=== Future operators ===
Pakistan Air Force: being integrated as of 2026.

== Variants ==
- Shahpar-III (140 hp): Version fitted with 140 hp engine.
- Shahpar-III (170 hp): Version fitted with more powerful 170 hp engine.

== Specifications (170hp configuration) ==
Data from

General characteristics

- Crew: None
- Wingspan: 20 m (64 ft)
- Max takeoff weight: 1,650 kg (3,638 lb)

Performance

- Range: 3,000 km (1,900 mi, 1,600 nmi)
- Endurance: 40hrs (ISR) and 20hrs (Armed)
- Service ceiling: 12,000 m (41,000 ft) Varies with suspended payload.

Armament

- Hardpoints: 6 with a capacity of 530kg (external) & 165kg (internal)
- Rockets: Eghraaq smart torpedo
- Missiles: Barq laser guided missiles
- Bombs: AB-500 LGBs

== See also ==
- Burraq
- Bayraktar TB2
