= List of retired Pakistan Air Force aircraft =

This is a list of aircraft retired from service from the Pakistan Air Force.

== Retired aircraft ==
Aircraft	Image	Origin	Class	Role	Introduced	Retired	Total (acquired & retired/lost)	Notes
Chengdu F-7P Skybolt		China	Jet	Interceptor	1988	2023	120	Replaced by Block 1 and Block 2 CAC/PAC JF-17 Thunders
Aérospatiale SA 316B/319 Alouette III		France	Helicopter	Search and rescue	1967	2019-2026	35	Replaced by AgustaWestland AW139M and Airbus H125 helicopters.
Shenyang JJ-5/FT-5		China	Jet	Advanced Jet Trainer	1975	2012	50	Replaced by K-8P Karakorums
Nanchang Q-5III/A-5C		China	Jet	Attack	1983	2011	58	Replaced by Block 1 CAC/PAC JF-17 Thunders
Airbus A310		Europe	Jet	VIP Transport	2009	2014	1	Transferred to PIA, Replaced by A319.
Boeing 707-300		United States	Jet	VIP Transport	1986	2008	3	707-340C and 707-351B. Two aircraft transferred from PIA in 1986. A third aircraft in VIP transport configuration delivered in 1987. One aircraft sold to a private individual in 2008. Two aircraft scrapped in 2008-2009. Replaced by an ex-PIA Airbus A310-304 in 2009.
Shenyang J-6C/F-6C		China	Jet	Fighter	1965	2002	253	Replaced by F-7Ps and F-7PGs
Mikoyan-Gurevich MiG-19S		Soviet Union	Jet	Air superiority fighter	1965	2002	5	Replaced by F-7Ps. Received five ex-Indonesian Air Force Mig-19S in December 1965 as part of a friendship deal between Pakistan and Indonesia.
Lockheed T-33 T-Bird		United States	Jet	Trainer	1955	1993	21	15 T-33A trainers, 6 RT-33A reconnaissance aircraft. Replaced by T-37s and K-8P Karakorums
Kaman HH-43B Huskie		United States	Helicopter	Search and rescue	1964	1993	4	4 in service in June 1972 and November 1993.
Martin B-57 Canberra		United States	Jet	Bomber	1959	1985	28	2 x RB-57B served with No. 24 ELINT Squadron "Blinders". 24 served with No. 31 Wing. 24 B-57B and 2 B-57C
Martin RB-57F Canberra		United States	Jet	Reconnaissance	1964	1973	2	2 x RB-57F served with No. 24 ELINT Squadron "Blinders".
Grumman SA-16A Albatross		United States	Propeller	Patrol	1950s	1981	4	Search and Rescue, coastal patrol and maritime reconnaissance.
Shenyang JJ-2/FT-2		China	Jet	Fighter	1966	1980	6	Chinese-built Mikoyan-Gurevich MiG-15 UTI (called U-MiG-15 in the PAF). Replaced by FT-6s.
North American F-86 Sabre		United States	Jet	Fighter	1955	1980	210	120 x North American F-86F-35-NA and F-40-NA, 90 ex-Iranian Canadair CL-13B Sabre Mk.6. Replaced by Dassault Mirage IIIEs and Dassault Mirage 5s
Lockheed F-104 Starfighter		United States	Jet	Fighter	1961	1972	14	12 x F-104A, 2 x F-104B. under Royal Pakistan Air Scouts
Sikorsky UH-19D Chickasaw		United States	Helicopter	Search and rescue	1956	1971	8	First helicopter operated by the PAF.
North American T-6G Harvard IV		United States	Propeller	Trainer	1947	1970s	12	Introduced on formation of the Royal Pakistan Air Force.
Hawker Siddeley Trident 1E		United Kingdom	Jet	Transport	1967	1970	4	VIP transport.
Harbin H-5		China	Jet	Bomber	1966	1969	16	Chinese-built Ilyushin Il-28, designated B-56 in the PAF. 16 aircraft
Bristol Freighter Mk 21E		United Kingdom	Propeller	Transport	1950s	1966	81	
Hawker Sea Fury		United Kingdom	Propeller	Fighter	1949	1963	~97	~92 x FB 60. 5 x T-61 two-seat trainers. Replaced by Lockheed F-104 Starfighters
Vickers VC.1 Viking IB		United Kingdom	Propeller	Transport	1947	1962	1	VIP transport. Preserved in the PAF Museum.
Supermarine Attacker FB.50		United Kingdom	Jet	Fighter	1951	1958	36	. "De-navalised" Attacker FB.2 with tail hook removed and wings "locked down". First jet fighter in PAF service.
de Havilland DH.82A Tiger Moth		United Kingdom	Propeller	Trainer	1947	1957	7	Biplane. Introduced on formation of the Royal Pakistan Air Force.
Hawker Tempest Mk II		United Kingdom	Propeller	Fighter	1947	1956	24	Received on formation of the Royal Pakistan Air Force.
Douglas C-47B Dakota		United States	Propeller	Transport	1947	1955	2	Introduced on formation of the Royal Pakistan Air Force.
Handley Page Halifax B.VI		United Kingdom	Propeller	Bomber	1948	1954	16	The PAF was the last air force to retire the Halifax in 1961.
Bristol Brigand B.1		United Kingdom	Propeller	Anti ship/Torpedo bomber	1948		2	2 delivered in 1948 for evaluation in No. 11 Squadron.
Supermarine Spitfire Mk VIII		United Kingdom	Propeller	Fighter	1947	1947	16	
Hawker Typhoon		United Kingdom	Propeller	Fighter	1947		16	
Auster Autocrat		United Kingdom	Propeller	Utility, Light observation				
Taylorcraft Auster 5F		United States	Propeller	Utility, Light observation				
Bell OH-13S Sioux		United States	Helicopter	Light observation			~13	

== Aircraft undergoing retirement ==
Aircraft	Image	Origin	Class	Role	Introduced	Total (retired/lost)	Total (acquired)	Variants (retired)	Notes
Dassault Mirage III		France	Jet	Multirole	1968	86	135	IIIEP/O(F)/EE/EL IIIEA ROSE I	Gradually being phased out with the last to retire till 2030.
Dassault Mirage III		France	Jet	Multirole	1968	86	135	IIIDP/D(O)/DE/BE	Gradually being phased out with the last to retire till 2030.
Dassault Mirage III		France	Jet	Multirole	1968	86	135	IIIRP/RP2	Gradually being phased out with the last to retire till 2030.
Dassault Mirage 5		France	Jet	Multirole; Attack	1970	102	139	5PA/PA2/PA3	Gradually being phased out with the last to retire till 2030.
Dassault Mirage 5		France	Jet	Multirole; Attack	1970	102	139	5EF ROSE III	Gradually being phased out with the last to retire till 2030.
Dassault Mirage 5		France	Jet	Multirole; Attack	1970	102	139	5F/D/DE	Gradually being phased out with the last to retire till 2030.
Dassault Mirage 5		France	Jet	Multirole; Attack	1970	102	139	5DPA/DPA2	Gradually being phased out with the last to retire till 2030.
Dassault Mirage 5		France	Jet	Multirole; Attack	1970	102	139	5DD	Gradually being phased out with the last to retire till 2030.
Chengdu F-7PG Skybolt		China	Jet	Interceptor	2002	7	60	F-7PG	Gradually being phased out. All F-7P were retired by 2023. See the table above.

== See also ==
- List of active Pakistan Air Force aircraft
- Pakistan Air Force Museum
