= GIDS Uqab =

Pakistani UAV

General information
- Type: UAV; Reconnaissance
- Manufacturer: Global Industrial Defence Solutions
- Status: In service
- Primary users: Pakistan Navy Pakistan Army

History
- Manufactured: 2010–present
- Introduction date: 20 July 2011
- First flight: 20 March 2008
- Developed from: SATUMA Jasoos

The GIDS Uqab (lit. GIDS Eagle) is a tactical unmanned reconnaissance aerial vehicle built and developed by the Global Industrial Defence Solutions (GIDS) for the joint drone program of the Pakistan Navy and Pakistan Army. The Uqab is a tactical system which can be used for damage assessment, reconnaissance operations, artillery fire corrections, and can perform other variety of security and military operations.

Influence from the design of SATUMA Jasoos, it was developed by the GIDS and its electronics were upgraded by the NESCOM to meet requirement for the Navy and Army. Uqab is designed for executing the Army/Navy's joint missions, where nearly ~30 Uqabs have been inducted in army's drone program while one squadron is active in navy's drone program.

== Development ==
Development began in 2007 on the basis of the United States' drone program and the contract was awarded to Global Industrial Defence Solutions (GIDS). The Uqab's features a strong resembles from the AAI RQ-7 Shadow, which at one point were being offered by the US to Pakistan.

The Uqab program was designed for Pakistan Army's drone program and it took its first flight on 20 March 2008.

In the Army's drone program, the Uqab has been used for the battle damage assessment, aerial reconnaissance, artillery fire correction, joint forces operations, search and rescue missions, coastal area surveillance, route monitoring, internal security, mob control and flood relief operations.

The Uqab program eventually expanded from Army to Navy with combined Army/Navy team managed by the Navy's drone program in 2011. The Navy's ran several trial based operations with the management from the Army before commissioning the drone program of its own. During its trial phase, the Navy's Uqab drone crashed inside the premises of the National Oil Refinery located in Korangi Town. Major electronics upgrades were performed by the NESCOM for the before Uqab joined the Navy's drone program.

On 20 July 2011, Uqab was inducted in Navy's drone program and commissioned a ground base located near the Mehran Naval Base. Uqabs usually flown from a runway strip for take-off and landings like normal aircraft. A proper command and control mechanism installed in a truck that records the feedback sent by the drone comes along the Uqab system.

== Ground Control Station ==
Ground Control Station is a truck mounted air-conditioned, insulated container which is equipped with standard, ruggedized consoles.

== Characteristics ==
- User friendly mission planning and execution
- Mission de-briefing & simulation
- In-flight mission re-programming
- Flexible waypoints entry & editing during flight (direct from map & keypad)
- Mission parameter & flight data logger for post flight analysis & simulation
- Real time video and telemetry data
- Moving map software
- Geo-referencing
- Easy payload (camera) controls
- Separate consoles for mission commander, UAV pilot & payload operator
- Easy to read displays and gauges
- Standby control links (redundancy)
- Back-up power supply

== Export ==
Pakistan has attracted serious interest Uqab unmanned air system (UAS) from Bahrain and other countries in Asia and Africa, according to company officials, Potential Uqab customers include the UAE, Indonesia, Turkmenistan and Egypt.

== Accidents ==
An Uqab UAV of Pakistan Navy crashed in an oil refinery in Karachi when the UAV hit a bird on 2011.

== Specifications ==
Data from

General characteristics

- Length: 4 m (13 ft 1 in)
- Wingspan: 5.5 m (18 ft 1 in)
- Height: 1.2 m (3 ft 11 in)

Performance

- Cruise speed: 150 km/h (93 mph, 81 kn)
- Range: 150 km (93 mi, 81 nmi)
- Endurance: >6 hours
- Service ceiling: 3,000 m (9,800 ft)

Avionics

- Real time digital video Position and health of UAV Geo-referencing
- Autonomous GPS-based tracking and control system
- Gyro-stabilized gimbal with color day camera, thermal imager with target tracking and locking system

== See also ==
- Unmanned aerial vehicle
- List of unmanned aerial vehicles
- GIDS Shahpar
- Shahpar-2
