= Faaz =

Pakistani missile

- Type: Beyond-visual-range air-to-air missile
- Place of origin: Pakistan

Service history
- Used by: Pakistan Air Force; Pakistan Army

Production history
- Designer: NESCOM
- Manufacturer: GIDS
- Produced: Early 2020s
- Variants: See variants

Specifications
- Effective firing range: 8 km for Faaz-SL SAM version 100 km for Faaz-1 series 180 km for Faaz-2 BVRAAM
- Warhead: HE
- Detonation mechanism: Proximity fuze/Contact fuze
- Operational range: Faaz-RF: 100 km (62 mi); Faaz-IIR: 75–100 km (47–62 mi); Faaz-SL: 20–25 km (12–16 mi); Faaz-2: 180 km (110 mi)
- Flight altitude: 6,000 feet
- Maximum speed: 4321.8 km/h (Mach 3.5)
- Guidance system: Infrared homing and Active radar homing
- Launch platform: Aircraft & Ground vehicle

The Faaz (Urdu: فاز, lit. 'Victorious') is a family of under-development beyond-visual-range (BVR) air-to-air missiles produced by Pakistani defense conglomerate GIDS. It is intended for use both by air platforms as air-to-air missiles as well as ground-based air defense (GBAD) system units as a surface-to-air missile.

== Design ==
GIDS locally maintains and owns intellectual property rights of the Faaz missile.

== History ==
In 2024, media reports emerged from Turkey and Pakistan that both countries were planning to merge missile technology projects. It is expected that the Faaz and GÖKTUĞ missile projects will be merged in the near future.

On November 3, 2026, the Pakistan Air Force (PAF) completed the first successful test of the missile from a JF-17.

== Variants ==
=== Faaz-1 Series ===
- Faaz-SL: (Faaz-Surface Launched) SAM variant with max range of 20-25km. Operated from a ground vehicle.
- Faaz-RF: (Faaz-Radio Frequency) Active radar guided version with 25 km seeker detection range. Overall range exceeds 100 km (62 mi), max speed is Mach 3.5 and can fly 6,000 feet above sea level.
- Faaz-IIR: (Faaz-Imaging Infra-Red) Infrared homing version with 40 km seeker detection range. Overall range exceeds 100 km (62 mi), max speed is Mach 3.5 and can fly 6,000 feet above sea level.

=== Faaz-2 Series ===
- Faaz-2: Upgraded BVRAAM version with up to 180 km range.

== Operators ==
=== In future ===
Pakistan

- Pakistan Air Force
- Pakistan Army

== See also ==
- PL-12 – (China)
- AIM-120 AMRAAM – (United States)
- AIM-7 Sparrow – (United States)
- R-77 – (Russia)
- Meteor (missile) – (France, United Kingdom, Italy, Germany, Spain, Sweden)
- Astra (missile) – (India)
- PL-15 – (China)
