= Air Weapons Complex =

Weapons development complex for the Pakistan Air Force

- Founded: February 18, 1992; 34 years ago
- Country: Pakistan
- Branch: Pakistan Air Force
- Type: Research and development
- Role: Military science and technology
- Part of: Joint Strategic Planning, JS HQ
- Garrison/HQ: Hasan Abdal, Punjab
- Nickname: AWC

Commanders
- Director-General: AVM Ghulam Shabbir

The Air Weapons Complex (reporting name:AWC) is a military research and development complex for the Pakistan Air Force, headquartered in Hasan Abdal, Punjab, Pakistan.

The AWC plays a pivotal role in air–borne weapons development and integration in aerospace war-fighting technologies for the Pakistan Air Force. Direction and weapons development guidance comes directly from the air force but the complex is managed and operated as a division under the civilian contract of National Engineering & Scientific Commission (NESCOM).

== Overview ==
Since 1985, the Pakistan Air Force had been working warplans and wargames techniques on addressing the weapons delivery of nuclear discharges from the supersonic fighter jets. In February 1992, the Pakistan Air Force officially established the weapons research and development complex in cooperation with the civilian Pakistan Atomic Energy Commission (PAEC) near the Metallurgical Laboratory in Wah Cantonment, an army base. The AWC embarked on studying the aerodynamics and developing software that specialized in advancing the airborne applications of direct-energy and explosive engineering.

In 1993, the AWC had an influential and pivotal role in helping to established the National Defence Complex (NDC) for the Pakistan Army. The AWC was a major weapons development complex in leading the designs and development of the nuclear variant air-launched cruise missiles (ALCM). As contrary to its army complex, the programs at the AWC have been under the Air Force's control since its inception, though the civilian National Engineering and Scientific Commission (NESCOM) does provides the management and technical services to the AWC as its prime contractor since 2001.

The AWC's current director-general is AVM, which is an equivalent of Major-General, Ghulam Shabbir.

== Products ==
=== Airborne systems ===
- Airborne Video Tape Recorder system (AVTR)
- Airborne Digital Data Recorder system
- Infra-red search and track system (IRST)
- GNSS navigation system
- Mechanical gyro and iFOG-based inertial navigation system (INS)
- MOHAFIZ counter-measures dispensing system
- Laser guidance for Pk.80 Series Bombs (based on Mk.80 Series license-manufactured design from the US)

=== Air-launched weaponry ===
- 6 kg, 11 kg – Practice bombs
- 250 kg – Pre-fragmented bomb
- Pk.80 Series – General-purpose bomb (based on Mk.80 Series)
  - 250 kg Pk.82
  - 500 kg Pk.83
  - 1000 kg Pk.84
- Al Battaar – Laser Guided Bomb (LGBs)
  - Al Battaar-500 (based on Pk.83 bomb)
  - Al Battaar-1000 (based on Pk.84 bomb)
- HAFR-1 – Anti-runway penetration bomb
- HAFR-2 – Anti-runway penetration bomb
- RPB-1 – Anti-runway penetration bomb
- H-2 SOW – Precision-guided munition
- H-4 SOW – Precision-guided munition
- Ra'ad – Air-Launched Cruise Missile
- Ra'ad-II – Air-Launched Cruise Missile

=== Electronics ===
- Air Defence Automation System (C4I system) – given to Bangladesh, installed by AWC engineers circa 2005.
- Electronic fuses for air-launched weapons (impact and proximity fuses)
- Real-time ACMI system
- Voice/Fax/Data encryption system

=== Other ===
- Multi-Spectral Camouflage Net - camouflages against night-vision, infra-red, radar and millimeter wave sensors as well as visual detection. Stated to reduce an object's radar cross-section (RCS) by 86% on average and reduce average detection range by 43.8%.

== Technical Expertise ==
- Software Development for Mission Critical Systems
- Nondestructive Testing Software and Mechanical Support
- Electronic System Design and Production
- Prototyping and Production of Specialized Mechanical Assemblies
- Mechanical Components Precision Manufacturing
- TQM Practices
- Mil-Spec Qualifications
- CAD/CAM Support

== Software and UCAV development ==
Between 1988 and 1998, the AWC worked on developing the codes and systems engineering software that would be integrated with the fighter jets before dropping the nuclear discharges at the military targets. The successful weapons software integration was carried out in 1995 and its results were confirmed during a simulated military exercise.

In 1998, the AWC embarked on a robotics engineering project for the indigenous development of combat unmanned aerial vehicles (UAV) with codenamed, the SKY TRACKER. The AWC developed Sky Tracker and Sky Navigator software suites were developed for the ground-based tracking of UAVs. The software retrieves the GPS position data from the UAV via a radio data-link 17 and uses it to show the position of the UAV as a 2D plot along with other essential data such as, speed, altitude, heading, and magnitudes. This plot can be overlaid onto area maps as well and this information is used by the pilot for flying the UAV from the ground-based command station.
