= Type 84 mine =

Anti-tank mine

The Type 84 is a Chinese air-dispersed scatterable anti-tank mine, normally deployed by the GBL212 122 mm artillery rocket, or the Type 122-15 ATML rocket for export versions. Each rocket can carry six or eight mines and has a range of around six or seven kilometres. The rockets are launched from a BM-21 Grad multiple rocket launcher system that can hold up to 24 of the rockets. A time fuse on the rocket is set before launch, which activates at a predetermined distance after firing. Upon activation, the rocket head bursts, ejecting the mines, which descend with small green parachutes that slow their fall. The mine consists of a cylindrical body with three prong legs that form a spike, which pierces the ground and arms. If the mine strikes soft ground, the spike is driven into the ground and the mine is held upright.

Three variants of the mine exist: one with a magnetic fuse which detonates upon magnetic influence, one with a self-extending tilt rod fuse, and another with a contact baffle. In addition, the magnetic fuse mine has an anti-handling device.

The mine's penetrator warhead uses the Misznay-Schardin effect to penetrate up to 110 millimetres of rolled homogeneous armour. The mines also have a self-destruct facility which can be set to between 4 and 72 hours, and will disarm itself after 72 hours.

== Operational history ==
On 7 May 2011, C.J. Chivers of The New York Times reported military forces loyal to Muammar Gaddafi scattered Type 84 Model A mines with magnetic fuses across the port of the disputed Libyan city of Misrata to threaten the city's sole route for evacuation and supplies. Delivered by a "Chinese-made variant of a Grad rocket", the mines were deployed at around 2100 or 2200 at night on 5 May. An estimate of at least 20 mines or 31 mines were dispersed across the port. A rebel truck patrolling the port hit two of the mines, injuring both men inside, with one seriously wounded. The incident was later confirmed by Human Rights Watch.

Also in Libya, Type 84 mines were also found in the coastal town of Dafniya by DanChurchAid (DCA) and in the city of Sirte by the Swiss Foundation for Mine Action (FSD). In November 2011, two DCA staff were injured while trying to neutralise a mine in Dafniya and had to be hospitalised. In March 2012, a DCA international deminer was killed by another mine while clearing buildings of explosives in Dafniya.

As of April 2014, the Syrian “Dignity Brigade” was in possession of Type 84 mines and components in the Golan Heights of the Syrian governorate of Quneitra, according to a video posted by the group, which depicted the submunitions.

As of December 2016, the Shura Council of Benghazi Revolutionaries were reportedly in possession of Type 84 mines, when Libyan National Army forces found an unused example left behind in the Ganfouda district of Benghazi in Libya.

== Users ==
- China
- Libya
- Syria
- Pakistan

== Specifications ==
- Diameter: 114 mm
- Height: 160 mm
- Weight: 3.12 kg
