= Burq =

Family of Laser-guided munitions from GIDS

- Type: Laser-guided air-to-surface missile/Anti-tank guided missile
- Place of origin: Pakistan

Service history
- In service: Since 2015
- Used by: See Users
- Wars: War on terror; Insurgency in Khyber Pakhtunkhwa; * 2026 Afghanistan-Pakistan War

Production history
- Designer: NESCOM
- Manufacturer: GIDS
- Variants: See Variants

Specifications
- Mass: 45 kg (99 lb)
- Length: 1,450 mm (57 in)
- Width: 180 mm (7.1 in)
- Operational range: 8 km
- Flight ceiling: 5,000 m (16,000 ft)
- Maximum speed: Mach 1.1
- Guidance system: Semi-active laser homing
- Accuracy: 90%
- Launch platform: UCAVs and Attack helicopters

Burq, (Urdu: برق, "lightning") is a family of laser-guided missiles produced by Pakistani defence conglomerate Global Industrial Defence Solutions (GIDS).

Burq has been developed for air–ground missions particularly for low-payload-capacity air platforms like UCAVs. It can engage both stationary and moving targets with high precision.

== Design & Development ==
The Burq program started initially as a stand-alone air to ground missile when it was revealed to the public by the Inter-Services Public Relations in March 2015 being fired from a NESCOM Burraq UCAV during test trials, capable of destroying both stationary and moving targets.

By 2024, the Barq had undergone significant R&D phases through which it was transformed into a whole family of missiles with different specifications.

=== Combat use ===
The Burq's first combat mission was carried out against militants during Operation Zarb-e-Azb in the Shawal Valley of North Waziristan District, on 6 September 2015, successfully eliminating three high-value targets.

== Variants ==
- Burq: Base version introduced in 2015.
- Burq-50P: 50 kg version.
- Burq-45P: 45 kg version.
- Burq-25G: 25 kg miniature version.

== Technical specifications ==
	Burq (2015)	Burq-50P	Burq-45P	Burq-25G
Diameter	180 mm (7.1 in)	180 mm (7.1 in)	180 mm (7.1 in)	160 mm (6.3 in)
Length	1,450 mm (4 ft 9 in)	1,450 mm (4 ft 9 in)	1,450 mm (4 ft 9 in)	1,000 mm (3 ft 3 in)
Weight	45 kg (99 lb)	50 kg (110 lb)	45 kg (99 lb)	25 kg (55 lb)
Range	2.5 to 8 km (1.6 to 5.0 mi)	2.5 to 12 km (1.6 to 7.5 mi)	2.5 to 12 km (1.6 to 7.5 mi)	3 to 12 km (1.9 to 7.5 mi)
Guidance	Semi-active laser	Semi-active Laser Homing + GNSS (Optional)	Semi-active laser Homing	Semi-active Laser Homing + GNSS (Optional)
Warhead	Multi-purpose warhead	20kg Blast Fragmentation or Anti-Armour warhead	10kg Blast Fragmentation, Anti-Armour or Shaped charge explosive	9kg Blast Fragmentation
Fuse	Proximity or Impact	Electro-mechanical	Electro-mechanical	Electro-mechanical
Platforms	UCAVs and Attack helicopters	UCAVs	UCAVs	UCAVs

== Mountable Platforms ==
Sources:

- Bayraktar Akıncı
- Bayraktar TB2
- GIDS Shahpar-II
- GIDS Shahpar-III
- NESCOM Burraq

== Operators ==
- Pakistan
  - Pakistan Armed Forces

== See also ==
- AGM-114 Hellfire
- HJ-10
- Polyphem
- XM501 Non-Line-of-Sight Launch System
- ALAS (missile)
- AGM-169 Joint Common Missile
- HOT (missile)
- Spike (missile)
- PARS 3 LR
- Nag

Related lists

- List of anti-tank guided missiles
