= P3 Mk2 mine =

Pakistani weapon

The P2 Mk2 and P3 Mk2 are Pakistani plastic cased minimum metal anti-tank blast mines. The P2 Mk2 has a square case with a central circular ribbed pressure plate, the P3 is circular with a central circular pressure plate. Both mines use anti-personnel mines as the fuse, typically the either the P4 Mk1 or P2 Mk2 anti-personnel mines. The anti-personnel mine sits in a cavity below the pressure plate, when enough pressure is place on the pressure plate of the mine, it collapses onto the anti-personnel mine triggering it and the main charge which sits below it. A yellow canvas carrying strap is normally fitted to the side of the mine. thumb The mines have a secondary fuse well on the bottom which can be used with anti-handling devices. A GLM-2 electronic booby trap can be fitted to the cavity under the pressure plate. The mine is supplied with a steel disc which makes the mine more easily detectable, although this is seldom used.

Pakistan has stated it has only produced a detectable version of the mine since 1997, to comply with the Convention on Conventional Weapons amended protocol II, Pakistani stocks of the mine are being retrofitted with steel detection discs. The mines are found in Afghanistan, Angola, Eritrea, Ethiopia, Pakistan, Somalia, and Tajikistan.

== Specifications ==
- Length/Diameter: 270 mm
- Height: 130 mm
- Weight: 6.5 to 7 kg
- Explosive content: 5 kg of TNT
- Operating pressure: 180 to 300 kg when fitted with pressure plate, 10 kg without
