= Pakistan International Maritime Expo and Conference =

Pakistani maritime trade fair

Pakistan International Maritime Expo and Conference (PIMEC) پاکستان انٹرنیشنل میری ٹائم ایگزیبیشن اینڈ کانفرنس
- Status: Active
- Genre: Maritime and Defence exhibition
- Dates: November
- Frequency: Biennial: Odd years
- Venue: Karachi Expo Center
- Location: Karachi
- Country: Pakistan
- Inaugurated: 2023; 3 years ago
- Previous event: 2025
- Next event: 2027
- Participants: 178 exhibitors (2025)
- Attendance: c. 25,000 Visitors (2025)
- Organiser: Badar Expo Solutions
- Website: pimec.gov.pk

Pakistan International Maritime Exhibition & Conference (PIMEC) (Urdu: پاکستان انٹرنیشنل میری ٹائم ایگزیبیشن اینڈ کانفرنس) is a major international maritime event focusing on regional Blue economy while also serving as an exhibition for defense and security industry. It is held every two years in the Karachi Expo Center, Karachi, Pakistan.

== Event history ==
PIMEC was initiated by the Pakistan Navy, under the patronage of the Ministry of Maritime Affairs in order to showcase the country's maritime potential and boost its Blue economy by attracting investment, driving innovation, and fostering cooperation in shipping, defense, energy, fisheries, and tourism. The event is managed and organised by Badar Expo Solutions.

=== PIMEC 2023 ===
Premier PIMEC event held from 10 to 12 February 2023 at the Karachi Expo Center with 133 exhibitors, including 21 international firms and 112 local firms along with Pakistan-based international organizations participated in the 3-day exhibition.

=== PIMEC 2025 ===
Second event held from 3 to 6 November 2025 at the same venue with 178 exhibitors participating in the event. These included 28 international firms and 150 local organizations.

== See also ==
- International Defence Exhibition and Seminar—Defence expo in Karachi, Pakistan
- Special Operations Forces Exhibition—Defence expo in Amman, Jordan
