= GIDS Spider =

Pakistani Anti-Drone System

Spider-AD
- Type: Counter-unmanned aircraft system
- Place of origin: Pakistan

Production history
- Designer: Defence Science & Technology Organisation
- Designed: 2023
- Manufacturer: GIDS

Specifications
- Effective firing range: >10km (jamming range)
- Transport: Hino Dutro

The Spider is a mobile electronic warfare anti-drone system produced by the Pakistani conglomerate GIDS. It is Pakistan's first locally made counter-UAV system designed to disrupt Loitering munitions and MALE UAVs by jamming their communication and satellite navigation systems.

== Overview ==
The Spider is a counter-unmanned aircraft system (CUAS) designed by the Defence Science & Technology Organisation of GIDS. The system was unveiled during the ADEX 2024 defense exhibition in Baku and is designed to jam data transmission between the UAV and its controllers at ranges more than 10 km. It can block GPS, radio and satellite positioning systems. The system comes in both vehicle as well as on man portable tripod mounted versions.

== Variants ==
- Spider - Standard truck mounted version based on the 1.5 ton Hino 300.
- Spider-Portable - Man portable version deployed on a tripod.

== Operators ==
Pakistan

- Pakistan Armed Forces
- Pakistan Air Force

== See also ==
- Bukovel
- EDM4S
