= Eghraaq =

Eghraaq torpedo
- Type: Lightweight ASW torpedo
- Place of origin: Pakistan

Production history
- Designer: Maritime Technologies Complex
- Designed: 2024
- Manufacturer: GIDS

Specifications
- Mass: 200-300kg
- Length: 2.794 m (2,794 mm)
- Diameter: 0.25 m (9.8 in; 250 mm)
- Effective firing range: 8 km (5.0 mi; 4.3 nmi)
- Warhead: Shaped charge High Explosive
- Detonation mechanism: Contact fuze
- Engine: Lithium battery
- Maximum depth: 400 m (1,300 ft)
- Maximum speed: Greater than 40 kn (74 km/h; 46 mph)
- Guidance system: Acoustic homing
- Launch platform: Helicopters; MPA; UCAVs

The Eghraaq (Urdu: اغراق, "Immersion") is a Pakistani lightweight torpedo developed by Global Industrial Defence Solutions (GIDS). It is the first anti-submarine munition to be locally developed in Pakistan and was first revealed to the public during the IDEAS-2024 Expo at Karachi.

== Overview ==
The Eghraaq is reportedly designed by the Maritime Technologies Complex as a low cost alternative to similar systems like the American Mark 54. Its existence had been briefly mentioned in past product roadmaps presented by GIDS where it had resolved to develop an advanced torpedo of lightweight category which would have an operating depth of 450m along with range of 6-7km and a maximum speed of 35-45 knots.

The torpedo was revealed to the public in November 2024 during the IDEAS-2024 international defense exhibition at Karachi. It is equipped with an acoustic seeker to lock on underwater targets for which GIDS promises a 90% target acquisition efficiency rate and a shaped charged high explosive warhead for anti-armor applications. The torpedo is electrically powered through a lithium battery which enables its hydrodynamically designed body to maneuver easily and evade counter measures. Moreover, its compact design enables it to be fired from various platforms including UCAVs.

== Platforms ==
The lightweight torpedo can be launched by patrol aircraft, ships, helicopters and UCAVs such as Baykar Bayraktar Akıncı.

== See also ==
- MU90 Impact - French/Italian equivalent
