= GIDS Shahpar-II =

Pakistani unmanned combat aerial vehicle

Shahpar II
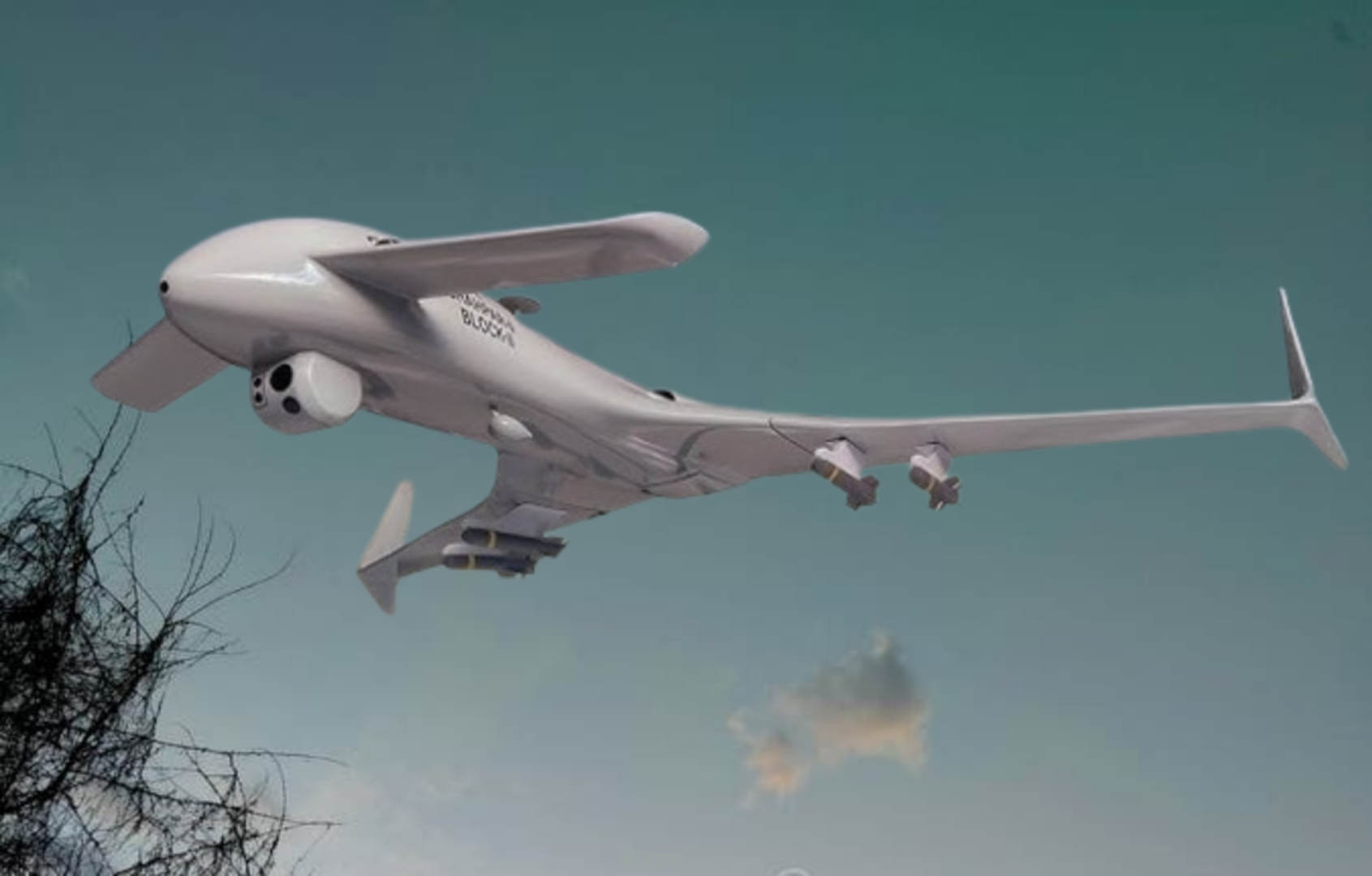
- A GIDS Shahpar 2 Drone carrying four missiles

General information
- Type: Reconnaissance/Attack
- National origin: Pakistan
- Manufacturer: Global Industrial Defence Solutions
- Designer: GIDS
- Status: In service

History
- Introduction date: 2021
- Developed from: GIDS Shahpar
- Developed into: GIDS Shahpar-III

The Shahpar-ll is an unmanned combat aerial vehicle (UCAV) built by Global Industrial Defence Solutions of Pakistan. It is currently in production following the completion of a test and qualification phase.

According to an engineer of AERO (Advanced Engineering Research Organisation), one of the seven companies forming the GIDS consortium, the only parts of the Shahpar aircraft system not produced in Pakistan are the engine and tires. The sensor suite, a multi-sensor turret designated "Zumr-II (EO/IR)", is built at an AERO facility near Islamabad. The design features a pusher engine with canard foreplanes in front of the wings.

The Shahpar II is designed to autonomously take off and land on a runway or land with a parachute. Payloads are available for reconnaissance and day/night surveillance. Targets on the ground can be geo-referenced and geo-pointed by the avionics. The military standard hardware is built to Environmental Standard 810F. Ground equipment is capable of mission planning and simulation; mission management and control as well as debriefing of ground crew. An upgraded version Shappar-2 block II has been launched which boasts higher service ceiling and longer flight time.

On 24 August 2024, one of the UAV crashed in Bhakkar district, Punjab. The crash is due to technical error, but the exact cause is under investigation.

Reuters had reported that Pakistani sources confirmed the use of the Shahpar-II during the 2025 India-Pakistan conflict.

== Development ==
On March 23, 2021, Shahpar-II drone was first exhibited publicly during the Pakistan Day parade. It was being developed as an improved version of GIDS Shahpar.

On 28 November 2021, at EDEX 2021 Operational specifications were unveiled by GIDS and a promotional video of Shahpur-II drone showing its locating, tracking and targeting capabilities as surveillance and ground attack drone. Zumr-II (EO/IR) turret was also unveiled as an improved and lighter version of Zumr-I (EP) turret. Targeting / surveillance Turret is installed as internal payload. Drone can also be equipped with other targeting system available from foreign supplier. Drone can also be equipped with SAR, COMINT/ELINT payload. For sensors and targeting systems drone has an internal hard-point where it carry 50 kg (110 lb) payload. (Zumr-I weighs 36.5 kg (80 lb) while Zumr-II weighs 49 kg (108 lb)). The drone has two external hard-points where it can carry Laser guided weapons, AGMs 60 kg (130 lb) each. The promo shows Shahpar-II drone firing Barq laser guided ASM on moving and still targets with high accuracy.

== Features ==
- Improved Aerodynamics & Structure
- Enhanced Payload Options (i.e. COMINT/ELINT, SAR. EO/IR)
- SATCOM capable
- Mid-air Engine restart capability
- Equipped with ATC transponder/Provision of IFF
- Provision of Internal Pilot
- Enhanced Propulsion System
- Retractable Landing Gears
- Asymmetric landing

== Specifications (Shahpar-2 Block 2) ==
Data from

=== General characteristics ===
- Length: 8 m (26 ft 3 in)
- Wingspan: 9.45 m (31 ft 0 in)
- Max takeoff weight: 1,075 kg (2,370 lb)
- Payload: 53 kg (117 lb) internal, 190 kg (420 lb) external

=== Performance ===
- Maximum speed: 120 knots (220 km/h)
- Cruise speed: 85 knots (157 km/h)
- Stall speed: 63 knots (117 km/h)
- Endurance: 20 hours surveillance, 12 hours armed
- Service ceiling: 23,000 ft (7,010 m) surveillance, 21,000 ft (6,401 m) armed

=== Armaments ===
- Hardpoints: 4, with provisions to carry:
  - Barq Laser guided missile

=== Avionics ===
- GIDS Zumr-II (EO/IR) multi-sensor turret
- Autonomous GPS-based tracking and control system
- Real-time data link (LoS) (300 km range)
- SATCOM data link (1500 km range)

== Shahpar-III ==
The Shahpar-III Medium-altitude long-endurance UAV development is on the way and its first flight is expected around the end of 2023. It was displayed in IDEF Turkey along with the new Faaz Air to Air missile.

== See also ==
- Unmanned aerial vehicle
- GIDS Shahpar
- NESCOM Burraq

Related lists

- List of unmanned aerial vehicles
