= GIDS Sarkash =

Pakistani One-way attack drone

- Type: One-way attack drone
- Place of origin: Pakistan

Service history
- Used by: Pakistan Armed Forces

Production history
- Designer: Global Industrial Defence Solutions
- Manufacturer: Global Industrial Defence Solutions

Specifications
- Mass: 175 Kilograms
- Effective firing range: 700–1000 km

The GIDS Sarkash (Urdu: سرکش, lit. 'Rebellious', also known as Sarfarosh or Sarfirosh) is a long-range One-way attack drone (UAV) and loitering munition drone developed by Pakistani defense conglomerate GlDS. It was first revealed as the Sarkash-I at the IDEAS 2024 defence exhibition and described as a "kamikaze drone" by GIDS. It is primarily designed with the goal of being used against high-value targets, such as radars and buildings.

== Design and specifications ==
The Sarkash-I's design attributes mirror those of a cruise missile; this is most evident in the design of the fuselage, which uses a cylindrical Babur or Harbah-style design. Additionally, the Sarkash-I is foldable, allowing the missile to be carried in and deployed from a canister. While the canisters are not man-deployable, the lightweight Sarkash-I can be loaded on various light vehicles.

The Sarkash-I has the following specifications:

- Range: 700–1,000 km
- Weight: 175 kg
- Warhead Weight: 25–50 kg
- Warhead Type: Blast-fragmentation, etc.
- Endurance: ≥120 minutes
- Powerplant: Undisclosed turbojet

== See also ==
- GIDS Shahpar
