= VN22 =

Chinese Wheeled AFV

- 3d rendering of VN22
- Type: Armoured fighting vehicle
- Place of origin: China

Service history
- In service: 2023–present
- Used by: See Operators

Production history
- Designer: Norinco
- Manufacturer: Norinco
- Produced: 2021–present
- Variants: See Variants

Specifications
- Length: 7.2 m (24 ft)
- Width: 3 m (9.8 ft)
- Height: 2.4 m (7 ft 10 in)
- Crew: 3
- Passengers: 8
- Armor: With bolt-on armour: all-around 14.5 × 114 mm protection (STANAG 4569 level 4)
- Main armament: 30 mm autocannon; 105 mm cannon (VN22B)
- Secondary armament: 2 x HJ-12 ATGM; QJC-88 12.7 mm heavy machine gun, Type 86 7.62 mm coaxial machine gun (VN22B)
- Suspension: wheeled 6x6
- Maximum speed: 110 km/h (68 mph)

The VN22 is a family of Chinese wheeled 6x6 armoured fighting vehicles intended for export. Designed and produced by Norinco, it was first unveiled at the 13th China International Aviation & Aerospace Exhibition in 2021.

== Development ==
The VN22 was developed by Chongqing Tiema Industrial Group, a subsidiary of Norinco, as the successor to the WZ551 series of wheeled armored vehicles that had been exported to over 30 countries since the 1990s. Development began in 2018, with the design team focusing on addressing feedback from existing WZ551 operators regarding insufficient protection, simple fire control systems, and inadequate engine power. The vehicle was designed with a modular architecture to accommodate various mission requirements through different weapon stations and armor configurations.

== Design ==
=== Layout ===
Like many contemporary wheeled AFVs, the design of the VN22 is split into three main sections. The front situates both the driver, along with the engine that is mounted in a separate compartment to the right of the driver. The middle houses both the commander and gunner or operator of the remote controlled weapon station mounted on top of the hull. The rear space is reserved for accommodate for up to eight mounted infantry.

=== Armament ===
The first VN22 shown at Zhuhai Airshow 2021 was armed with the UW5 remotely operated turret housing a 30 mm autocannon and two anti-tank guided missiles on a retractable mount that is protected inside the turret when not in the firing position. Both the gunner and commander are equipped with independent panoramic sights with thermal imagers.

Since the VN22 was designed to be modular, the platform can be mounted with a variety of different turrets offering various weapon configurations including RCWS systems such as the UW5 and UW4B, as well as manned options.

=== Protection ===
The vehicle has appliqué armour plating covering the majority of the vehicle. When fully equipped, they give the vehicle the ability to protect against 14.5 mm amour-piercing rounds from all directions. It also features a V-shaped hull for enhanced protection against landmines and IEDs.

The VN22 (UW5) is equipped with 10 smoke grenade dischargers on the front of the turret, as well as the GL6 hard-kill active protection system (APS), with one launcher containing two charges being mounted on top of both sides of the turret. The GL6 is similar in both form and function to comparative active protection systems, such as the Israeli Iron Fist.

=== Mobility ===
According to Margalla Heavy Industries Limited, a wholly owned subsidiary of Heavy Industries Taxila, the Faaris/VN22 uses a 570 hp (425 kW) engine mated to a 7-speed automatic transmission.

== Variants ==
=== People's Republic of China ===
- 6x6
  - VN22: Original infantry fighting vehicle variant. It can be equipped with various different turrets featuring differing armament configurations.
  - VN22B: Assault gun variant featuring a larger, manned turret that resembles the one used on the WMA301. It is armed with a 105 mm cannon that is capable of firing all standard NATO 105 mm ammunition.
  - VN22 ARV: Armoured recovery vehicle based on the VN22 platform.
  - VN22 Ambulance: Armoured ambulance based on the VN22 platform.
  - VN22 Directed Energy Weapon: Variant with a directed energy weapon.
- 8x8
  - SH16A: 155 mm self-propelled howitzer
  - VA1: 125 mm assault gun

=== Pakistan ===
- 6x6
  - Faaris: Pakistani variant manufactured under license by Heavy Industries Taxila.

== Operators ==
- Burkina Faso - Burkina Faso Armed Forces: Approximately 25 units received in 2024. Unknown quantity of VN22B delivered in 2025.
- Iraq - Iraqi Ground Forces: Manufactured locally under license. Localised variant features a manned, open-top turret armed with a 12.7 mm CS/LM5 heavy machine gun.
- Ivory Coast - Armed Forces of the Republic of Ivory Coast: 6 VN22B.
- Mali - Malian Armed Forces: VN22 and VN22B received in 2025.
- Pakistan - Pakistan Armed Forces: FAARIS 6x6 (Pakistani variant).
- Senegal - Armed Forces of Senegal: 1 VN22 ARV, 1 VN22 Ambulance, 3 VN22B.
