= Al Battaar =

Al-Battaar
- Type: Laser guided bomb kit
- Place of origin: Pakistan

Service history
- Used by: Pakistan; Nigeria
- Wars: War on terror; Boko Haram insurgency; Insurgency in Khyber Pakhtunkhwa

Production history
- Designer: Qaswa Industries
- Manufacturer: Qaswa Industries
- Variants: Al Battaar-500; Al Battar-2000

Specifications
- Mass: 240 kg (530 lb) (AB-500); 900 kg (2,000 lb) (AB-2000)
- Effective firing range: 14.8 km (9.2 mi)
- Warhead: Mk. 83 or Mk. 84
- Guidance system: SALH
- Accuracy: 10m CEP
- Launch platform: Fighter Jets; UCAVs

The Al-Battaar is a series of laser-guided bombs (LGBs) developed in Pakistan by Qaswa Industries (aka Air Weapons Complex). It is one of Pakistan's first locally developed Precision Guided Munitions (PGM).

== Overview ==
The Al-Battaar is specifically designed to give high precision and accuracy within a promised 10m CEP. While the kit is made up of several key components, they are classified into two main groups. The Computer Control Group (CCG) installed on the front of the GPB and the Airfoil Group attached to the rear end of the GPB. The Al-Battar being a laser guided weapon relies on an external source to illuminate the target to guide it. This laser illuminator could be a targeting pod on board the launch platform, another aircraft (including drones), or a hand held Laser designator from soldiers or vehicles.

The weapon can be launched at a maximum altitude of up to 25,000 ft carried as one or multiple munitions through pylons and bomb-racks. With an operational range of 14 km, the LGB has max carriage speed limit of Mach-1.4 and release speed limit of Mach-1.2. Other than that, they also have the ability to be delivered in low altitude as well as in level, dive, and loft bombing methods.

== Variants ==
- Al Battaar-500: 240 kg version fitted on a Mk 82/Pk.82 bomb.
- Al Battaar-2000: 900 kg version fitted on a Mk 84/Pk.84 bomb.

== Operators ==
- Pakistan
  - Pakistan Air Force - Both variants used on several combat aircraft and UCAVs.
- Nigeria
  - Nigerian Air Force - AB-500 used by NAF JF-17s. 25 ordered in 2020 and delivered in 2021.

== Platforms ==
- PAC JF-17 Thunder
- J-10C Vigorous Dragon
- Dassault Mirage-V
- GIDS Shahpar III UCAV
- Baykar Bayraktar Akıncı

== See also ==
- Paveway
- JDAM
