= Zarb (missile system) =

Coastal anti-ship missile system

- Type: Anti-ship cruise missile

Service history
- In service: 2016–present
- Used by: Pakistan Navy

Specifications
- Maximum firing range: ~300 km (190 mi)
- Guidance system: Active radar homing Inertial guidance
- Launch platform: Transporter erector launcher

The Zarb (Urdu: ضرب; also known as Zarb Weapon System) is a Pakistani land-based anti-ship cruise missile (ASCM) coastal defence system. It was inducted into the Pakistan Navy (PN) in 2016 after successful public tests. The range and payload of the missile remain officially undisclosed, and it is launched using standard 8x8 transporter erector launcher (TEL) vehicles. Some reports indicate that the Zarb bears a close physical resemblance to the C-602 or C-802 ASCMs, which are produced by the China Aerospace Science and Industry Corporation, possibly indicating that the Zarb is a licence-produced or derivative missile with a range of 300 km (190 mi).

The missile was also successfully test-fired by the PN again in 2019 as part of a training exercise.

== See also ==
- Anti-access/area denial
- P282 SMASH
- YJ-62
- YJ-83
