= Global Industrial Defence Solutions =

Pakistani defense manufacturing company

Global Industrial & Defence Solutions
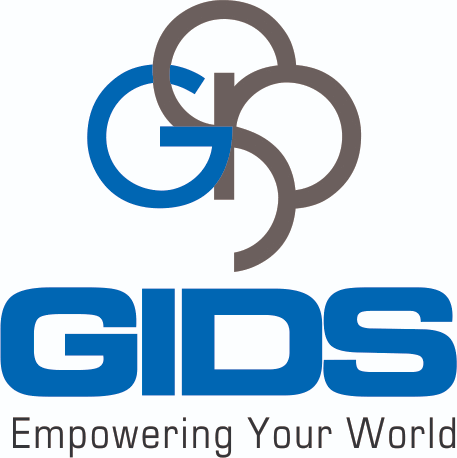
- GIDS Logo
- Type: State-owned enterprise
- Industry: Defense
- Founded: 2007
- Headquarters: Rawalpindi, Punjab, Pakistan
- Area served: Worldwide
- Owner: Government of Pakistan
- Number of employees: >27,000
- Website: gids.com.pk

Global Industrial & Defence Solutions (GIDS) is a Pakistani state-owned defence conglomerate, and the country's largest defence manufacturer, offering products for military applications.

== History ==
Founded in 2007 in Rawalpindi, Global Industrial & Defence Solutions was created to establish and expand Pakistan’s indigenous defence-manufacturing capability across air, land and sea domains. Initially the company produced conventional ordnance and protective equipment—general-purpose (GP) bombs, depth charges, grenades, ballistic helmets and bulletproof vests—meeting immediate domestic military needs and replacing reliance on imports.

During its first decade GIDS deliberately shifted from basic munitions and personal-protection gear toward guided weapons and force-multiplying systems. Research and development efforts produced precision guidance and range-extension kits for legacy bomb bodies, anti-tank and man-portable air-defence missiles, and air-to-air capabilities, reflecting a strategic move to modernize Pakistan’s strike and air-defence options while adapting existing inventories.

Organizationally, GIDS positioned itself as an integrator within Pakistan’s defence-industrial base—supplying components (including parts for main battle tanks), systems integration (IBMS/C4I) and upgrades that enable broader domestic manufacturing and operational capability. Leadership under CEO Asad Kamal has coincided with increased visibility and performance recognition in Pakistan’s defence sector.

== Production ==
GIDS invested heavily in electronics, sensors and systems integration. This evolution yielded C4I and battle-management solutions, artillery fire-control systems, electronic-warfare and counter-drone capabilities, and a suite of electro-optical and sonar sensors—positioning the company as a provider of integrated battlefield systems rather than only stand-alone weapons.

Naval and undersea capabilities were incorporated later, broadening the portfolio to include anti-ship and undersea weapons and associated platforms and support systems. GIDS also developed specialist NBC (nuclear, biological, chemical) protection and decontamination systems to meet non-kinetic defence requirements.

GIDS established itself as Pakistan’s largest state-owned UAV manufacturer, producing medium-range tactical and short-range/hand-launched/VTOL systems, and frequently demonstrating reconnaissance drones at regional arms fairs. The company expanded its international footprint through exports to markets in the Middle East and Africa and by participating in regional exhibitions to showcase vertically integrated solutions.

=== Unmanned aerial vehicle (UAVs) ===
- Shahpar
- Shahpar-II
- Shahpar-III
- Uqab
- Sarkash

=== Guided Missiles ===
- Faaz — Beyond-visual-range missile
- Baktar-Shikan — Anti-tank guided missile
- Anza — Man-portable air-defense system
- Harbah — Anti-ship Cruise Missile

=== Guided Bombs & Kits ===
- Al Battaar
- Takbir
- Nishana

=== Unguided Ordnance ===
- Pk-80 Series — General purpose steel bomb and pre-fragmented bomb
- Sea-Surge — anti-submarine depth charge

=== Torpedoes ===
- Eghraaq

=== Grenades & Non-lethal ===
- Stun grenades
- Smoke grenades
- Tear gas grenades

=== Electronics, Electro-Optics & Systems ===
- Spider
- MOHAFIZ
- Rehbar Pak-IBMS
- PAKFIRE

== See also ==
- Defence industry of Pakistan
- List of military equipment manufactured in Pakistan
- List of missiles of Pakistan
