= SATUMA Jasoos =

Unmanned aerial vehicle

Jasoos II
- Satuma Jasoos in camouflage coating on a Pakistani Airfield

General information
- Type: Tactical reconnaissance UAV
- Manufacturer: SATUMA
- Primary user: Pakistan Air Force

History
- Introduction date: 2009

Jasoos (Urdu: جاسوس spy) is an unmanned aerial vehicle designed and manufactured by SATUMA of Pakistan. The Jasoos II Bravo+ variant is currently operational with the Pakistan Air Force.

The Jasoos is controlled remotely from the ground control station (GCS) via a line-of-sight data-link. It can carry a range of payloads weighing up to 20 kg, the standard version being equipped with a daytime and low light camera capable of panning and tilting 360 degrees in azimuth and +/- 105 degrees in elevation. Endurance is stated to be greater than 5 hours. Jasoos II is believed to be based on the AWC Bravo+.

Jasoos II is a UAV to be employed for real time information and situational awareness. Bravo+, variant of Jasoos II UAV has been inducted in the Pakistan Air Force. Since its induction in Pakistan Air Force in 2004, Bravo+ has proven to be very reliable system that is extremely easy to operate and maintain. The UAV takeoff and land conventionally from a runway under manual control. Once airborne the UAV can fly autonomously where as mission can be controlled using line-of-site data links. Jasoos II can carry a variety of controllable payloads of up to 20 kg with an endurance of greater than 4 to 5 hours. The standard variant of Jasoos II is equipped with a steer-able day/low light camera pod capable of being steered 360 deg in azimuth and +/- 105 deg in elevation giving it the capability of panoramic viewing. Bravo+ is currently in production for the Pakistan Air Force as their primary work horse for UAV Operations and Training Program.

== Specifications (Jasoos II Bravo+) ==
Data from satuma

General characteristics

- Capacity: 15–25 kg (33–55 lb)
- Length: 4.27 m (14 ft 0 in)
- Wingspan: 4.92 m (16 ft 2 in)
- Max takeoff weight: 175 kg (386 lb)
- Powerplant: 1 × 2 cylinder, 2-stroke gasoline engine , 28 kW (38 hp)

Performance

- Maximum speed: 130 km/h (81 mph, 70 kn)
- Range: 100 km (62 mi, 54 nmi)
- Endurance: 4-5 hr
- Service ceiling: 3,048 m (10,000 ft)

Avionics

- Electro-optical payload
- Real-time data-link
- Remote control/pre-programmed autonomous navigation system

== See also ==
- Pakistan Air Force
