= NESCOM Burraq =

Pakistani UCAV

Burraq
- A NESCOM Burraq UAV

General information
- Type: UAV/UAS and UCAV
- National origin: Pakistan
- Manufacturer: NESCOM
- Status: In service
- Primary users: Pakistan Air Force Pakistan Army

History
- Manufactured: 2009-Present
- Introduction date: 2013
- First flight: 9 May 2009

The Burraq (Urdu: بُراق) is an unmanned combat aerial vehicle (UCAV) jointly developed and built by the National Engineering and Scientific Commission (NESCOM) and the Pakistan Air Force (PAF).

== Development ==
Since 2004, the United States (US) has been conducting controversial strikes with its own Unmanned Combat Aerial Vehicle systems in Pakistan's north-west territories, that target suspected militants in the region. For years, Pakistan had been pushing the US to allow it to acquire the MQ-1 Predator, the main UCAV system the US uses in the strikes, but such requests were denied amid fear of technology proliferation. Burraq development is thought to have primarily begun in 2009, with the contract being awarded to NESCOM in close coordination with the Pakistan Air Force.

Growing frustration over the US refusal and politicization of the US UCAV strikes in the country, the Burraq program is thought to have picked up its speed in secrecy. In 2012, China offered to help by selling Pakistan armed drones it had developed, but questions were raised about the capabilities of the drones. The first few models of the Burraq were only capable of surveillance and intelligence gathering, and lacked any offensive combat capability. Some of these early models were used by the Pakistani military to track down militants. The first combat capable version of the Burraq was first publicly demonstrated in March 2015.

The Burraq is thought to be inspired from the US MQ-1 Predator drone, the Chinese CASC Rainbow CH-3 A and the Italian Selex ES Falco.

About the Burraq program, Popular Science noted: "with the Burraq, Pakistan can now do drone strikes on their own, without the United States."

=== Origin of name ===
The name, Burraq, comes from interpretations of Surah Al Isra in the Qur'an. According to Islamic traditions, Buraq is a steed, described as a creature from the heavens which carried Muhammad from Makkah to Al-Aqsa and then to the heavens, and back to Makkah during Mi'raj (lit. "Night Journey"), which is the title of Surah Al Isra, one of the chapters in the Qur'an.

== Operational history ==
The first fleet of Burraqs was inducted in the Pakistan Air Force and Pakistan army in 2013 along with the Shahpar UCAV. It also carries various imagery and motion sensors, and is equipped with a laser guided air-to-surface missile named "Barq".

Inter-Services Public Relations (ISPR), the public relations department of the Pakistan Armed Forces, described the system as a "force multiplier."

After a successful demonstration of its ability to fire missiles at both stationary and moving targets, Pakistan became the fifth country in the world to successfully develop an unmanned combat aerial vehicle.

On 7 September 2015, the Burraq was used for the first time in a live military operation when it was used to fire on a terrorist compound in the Shawal Valley in the Pakistani tribal areas, eliminating three high-profile targets, according to the former Director General of the ISPR, Major General General Asim Saleem Bajwa. Pakistan became the fourth country after Israel, the US and the UK to use an armed drone in active combat.

Before the Burraq was publicly unveiled for the first time, the Pakistani military reportedly conducted several strikes using the UCAV, as part of the Khyber-1 military operations in the Tirah Valley.

== See also ==
- Unmanned combat aerial vehicle
- GIDS Shahpar
- GIDS Uqab
- SATUMA Jasoos
- CH-3 A
- MQ-1 Predator
