= GIDS Shahpar =

Pakistani UAV

Shahpar I
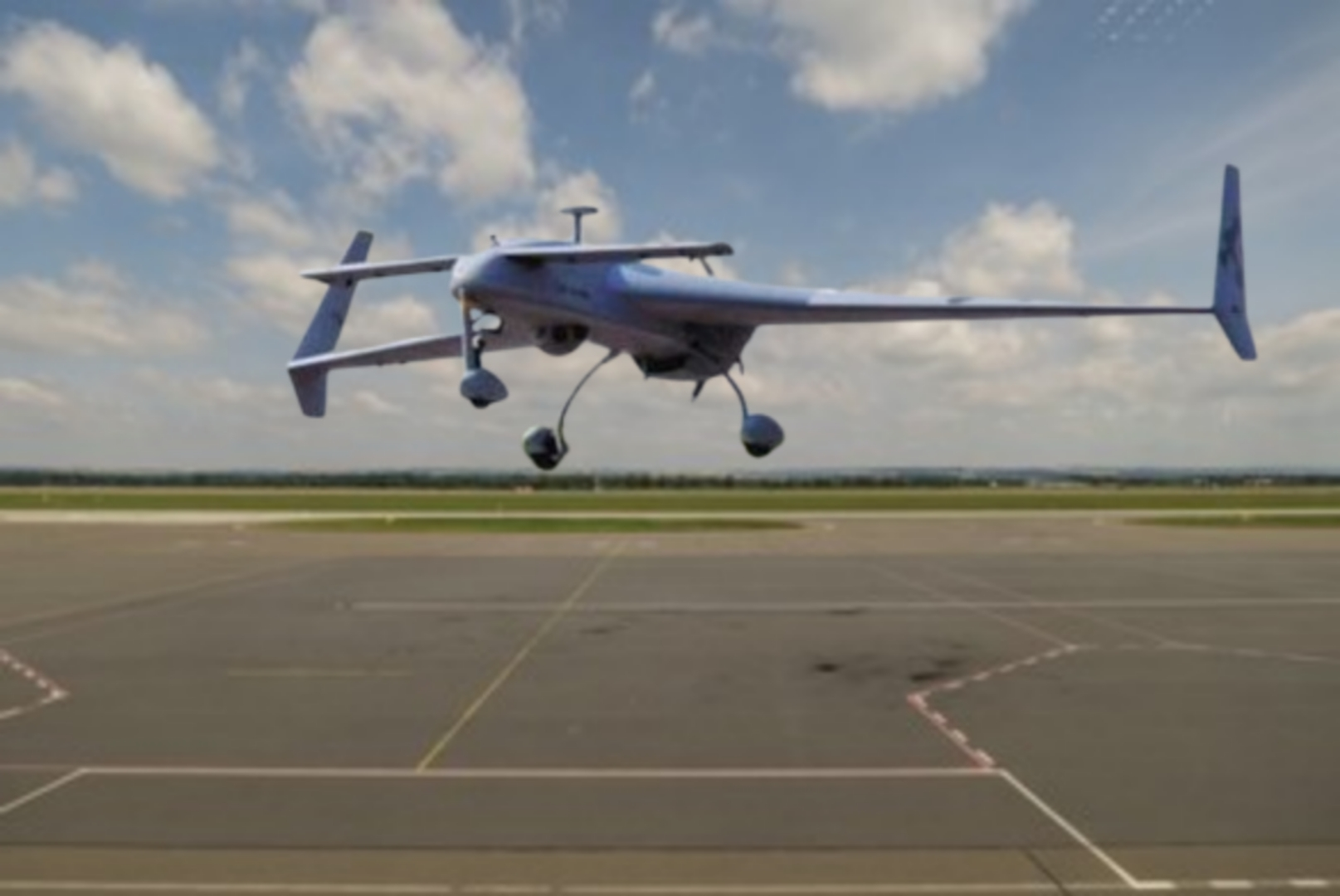

General information
- Type: Reconnaissance
- Manufacturer: Global Industrial Defence Solutions
- Designer: NESCOM
- Status: In service
- Primary users: Pakistan Air Force Pakistan Army
- Number built: 50

History
- Manufactured: ~2012
- Introduction date: 2012
- Developed into: Shahpar-2

The GIDS Shahpar is a family of unmanned aerial vehicle (UAV) built by Global Industrial Defence Solutions of Pakistan and used by the Pakistani military. It is currently in production following the completion of a test and qualification phase.

== Development ==
According to an engineer of AERO (Advanced Engineering Research Organisation), one of the seven companies forming the GIDS consortium, the only parts of the Shahpar aircraft system not produced in Pakistan are the engine and tyres. The sensor suite, a multi-sensor turret designated "Zumr-1 (EP)", is built at an AERO facility near Islamabad. The design features a pusher engine with canard foreplanes in front of the wings.

The Shahpar is designed to autonomously take off and land on a runway or deploy a parachute for landing. Payloads are available for reconnaissance and day/night surveillance. Targets on the ground can be geo-referenced and geo-pointed by the avionics. The military-standard hardware is built to Environmental Standard 810F. Ground equipment is capable of mission planning and simulation, mission management and control, as well as debriefing the ground crew.

== Operational history ==
The first fleet of Shahpars entered service with the Pakistan Air Force and Pakistan Army in 2013 along with the Burraq UCAV. Each flight is made up of five aircraft, a communications station and a ground control station.

== Variants ==
- Shahpar
- Shahpar-II
- Shahpar-III

== Specifications ==
Data from

General characteristics

- Capacity: 50 kg (110 lb) payload
- Length: 4.2 m (13 ft 9 in)
- Wingspan: 6.6 m (21 ft 8 in)
- Gross weight: 480 kg (1,058 lb)

Performance

- Cruise speed: 150 km/h (93 mph, 81 kn)
- Endurance: 7 hours
- Service ceiling: 5,000 m (16,000 ft)

Avionics

- Zumr-I (EP) multi-sensor turret
- Autonomous GPS-based tracking and control system
- Real-time data link (range 250 km)

== See also ==
- Unmanned aerial vehicle
- GIDS Shahpar-2
- GIDS Shahpar-III
- GIDS Sarkash

Related lists

- List of unmanned aerial vehicles
