= List of equipment of the Pakistan Air Force =

The following is an organized list of equipment used by the Pakistan Air Force.

== Air Defence Systems ==
Equipment	Image	Origin	OEM	Type	Variants / Qty	Notes
Surface-to-air missiles operated by Air Defence Command
HQ-19		China	CALT / CASIC	Very Long-range SAM/ABM/ASAT	HQ-19	Part of the strategic exo-atmospheric missile shield; active operational training commenced in 2026.
HQ-9		China	CASIC	Long-range SAM	HQ-9BE	Used by multiple SAM squadrons of PAF air defence branch.
HQ-16		China	CASIC	Medium Range SAM	HQ-16FE	Upgraded variant featuring advanced active radar homing seekers with an expanded interception envelope up to 70 km. Deployed across multiple SAM squadrons.
HQ-17		China	CASIC	SHORAD	HQ-17AE	Highly mobile, short-range anti-aircraft asset integrated on a 6×6 wheeled chassis. Capable of tracking stealth platforms and engaging drone swarms on the move up to 15 km. Formally unveiled in September 2026.
Aspide		Italy	MBDA	SHORAD	SPADA-2000	10 Batteries in service. Automated multi-target weapon system utilized to secure high-value military infrastructure.
Crotale		France	Thales	SHORAD	Crotale-2000 / 3000 / 4000	Crotale-2000, 3000 and 4000 versions in service with PAF air defence SAM squadrons.
FAAZ-SL (Under Development)		Pakistan	GIDS / NESCOM	SHORAD	FAAZ-SL (E-SHORADS)	Indigenous "Enhanced Short-Range Air Defence System" under development; repurposes the FAAZ beyond-visual-range missile airframe into a truck-mounted surface-to-air missile operating with dual active radar-homing (RF) and imaging infrared (IIR) tracking out to a range of 20–25 km.
Close-in weapon systems operated by Air Defence Command
LD-2000		China	NORINCO	C-RAM	LD-2000 / LD-3000	Mobile, land-based point-defense system featuring an 11-barrel 30mm Gatling gun with a firing rate of up to 12,000 rounds per minute. Utilized by the Pakistan Air Force and Army Air Defence units to defend strategic installations against low-altitude threats, guided missiles, and drone swarms.
LD-76		China	NORINCO	SPAAG	LD-76/SA-2	Mobile 76mm anti-aircraft gun system that places a modified naval cannon (H/PJ-26) onto a heavy 6x6 military truck chassis.
KORKUT		Turkey	Aselsan	SPAAG, C-RAM	Korkut 35	Tracked 35 mm automated low-altitude weapon system deployed alongside the SHORAD screen to defeat loitering munitions and cruise missiles. Revealed as an active drone-killer asset in September 2026.
Şahin		Turkey	Aselsan	Counter Unmanned Aerial System (C-UAS)	Şahin 40	Highly mobile 40 mm smart-munition physical intercept system designed for ultra-low altitude drone and rocket point destruction. Forms a unified layered anti-drone shield alongside Korkut and HQ-17AE.

== Radars ==
Equipment	Image	Origin	OEM	Inducted	Notes
Ground Radars
AM-350S		Pakistan	NRTC / Blue Surge	2026	3D Mobile Long Range Early Warning, featuring GaN modules and integrated onto a Hino 500 heavy truck chassis.
Machaan (G-RAD)		Pakistan	GIDS	2026	3D Tactical Low-to-Medium Altitude Surveillance, optimized to detect cruise missiles and small drone swarms.
SR-3D		Pakistan	NASTP	2024	S-Band Tactical Early Warning, features 30 RPM rotation for target acquisition paired with SAM batteries.
Airborne AESA (Under Development)		Pakistan	AWC / NUST	--	Dual S/X-Band Airborne Fire Control, developmental program for scaling indigenous GaN modules for UAVs and fighter upgrades.
YLC-8E		China	NRIET	2024	Multi Role Long Range, inducted as part of PADS-2020.
AN/TPS-77		United States	Lockheed Martin	2008	Inducted as part of PADS-2000 and later PADS-2020 program.
AN/TPS-43		United States	Westinghouse Electric Corporation	1980	TPS-43G and TPS-43J variants in service. Inducted under PADS-77 project.
YLC-2		China	NRIET	2001	Acquired in emergency during Operation Sentinel. Being replaced by YLC-2A and YLC-18s.
YLC-6		China	NRIET	2005	Low level radar inducted as part of PADS-2000.
YLC-18		China	NRIET	2020	Acquired under the PADS-2020 program.
MPDR-45		Germany / Pakistan	Siemens / PAC Kamra	1978	Low level radar acquired under the PADS-77 project. Mobile Low-Level Pulse Doppler Radar (45 km range). Modernized indigenously at PAC Kamra with digital signal processors and advanced electronic protective measures (EPM).
MPDR-90		Germany / Pakistan	Siemens / PAC Kamra	1978	Low level radar acquired under the PADS-77 project. Mobile Low-Level Pulse Doppler Radar (90 km range). Upgraded locally at PAC Kamra to feature solid-state electronics, improved clutter rejection, and upgraded EPM suite.

== Directed-energy weapons ==
Operated as specialized counter-unmanned aerial systems (C-UAS) and localized point-defense assets to safeguard strategic airbases.

Weapon System	Origin	Manufacturer/OEM	Introduced	Description
Fixed Laser System	Pakistan	GIDS / NECOP	2026	Vehicle-mounted High-Energy Laser (HEL) platform integrated for point defense at strategic airbases. Engineered to achieve physical "hard-kill" neutralizations against tactical UAV swarms and commercial low-altitude drones via precise thermal beam saturation. First publicly displayed at the Indus RAS Expo.

== Electronic Warfare and Jammers ==
System Name	Origin	OEM	Inducted	Type and Performance Notes
Ground-Based Jamming Platforms
Trident EA-1	Pakistan	NASTP	2025	Ground-based Electronic Warfare (EW), long-range mobile Electronic Attack (EA), and high-power offensive jamming platform with an operational reach of 400 km. Developed indigenously to target, disrupt, and blind enemy frequency-hopping data links, military communication networks, and satellite-guided tracking telemetry.
Drone Secur (UAS-G)	Pakistan	NRTC	2024	Ground-based Counter-UAS (C-UAS) electronic warfare system. Integrates localized, multi-directional jamming transmitters and short-range spoofing systems to create a protective electromagnetic dome over high-value installations, neutralizing the remote control and navigation links of incoming tactical drones.
Spider Anti-UAV System	Pakistan	GIDS / DESTO	2024	Mobile and portable ground-based Counter-UAV (C-UAS) electronic warfare system. Features an operational detection and soft-kill jamming range of over 10 km. Integrates radio frequency (RF) scanning, direction finding, wideband RF/GNSS jamming, and AI-driven Electro-Optical/Infrared (EO/IR) sensors with Slew-to-Cue functionality. Available in both tactical 4x4 truck-mounted and man-portable tripod configurations.
MP300 Manpack Jammer	Pakistan	NRTC	2023	Portable tactical Electronic Warfare (EW) and high-power Electronic Countermeasures (ECM) jammer. Designed for frontline tactical protection, blanketing localized areas with high-power VHF/UHF radio frequency energy to mask, jam, and block the remote control telemetry and detonation signals of micro-UAVs and explosive triggers.
Hisar-I	Pakistan	GIDS	2023	Ground-based Counter-UAV (C-UAS) and Area Denial electronic warfare system. Specifically optimized to counter loitering munitions and drone swarms by utilizing precision GNSS spoofing and telemetry link jamming, forcing hostile platforms to lose control or drop out of the sky without the need to expend surface-to-air missiles.
DESTO IEWS (Integrated Electronic Warfare System)	Pakistan	DESTO / GIDS	2022	Ground-based operational-level Electronic Warfare (EW) and offensive jamming complex. This comprehensive 7-vehicle mobile network combines long-range electronic intelligence (ELINT), communications intelligence (COMINT), and coordinated wideband active jamming (30 MHz to 6000 MHz) to systematically disrupt theater-level communications, search radars, and precision-guided weapon data links.
Mobile Wideband Jammer	Pakistan	NRTC	2021	Truck-mounted tactical communication jammer operating across the 30–6000 MHz spectrum. Features dynamic active barrage and reactive look-through jamming capabilities to blind tactical field radios and cell triggers.
VERA-E / VERA-NG	Czech Republic; Pakistan	ERA / NASTP	2019	Ground-based passive Electronic Warfare (EW) and Electronic Support Measures (ESM) tracking system. Operates in complete radio silence across four physical antenna stations deployed kilometers apart, utilizing multi-station Time Difference of Arrival (TDoA) to calculate 3D coordinates and trace up to 200 low-observable or stealth targets simultaneously without revealing its presence.
DWL-002 Passive Detection System	China	CETC	2016	Ground-based passive Electronic Warfare (EW) and Electronic Support Measures (ESM) surveillance system. Functions as a completely silent electronic counter-countermeasures (ECCM) sensor network that tracks airborne threats and stealth targets up to 400 km away by mapping their radio frequency emissions.

== Aircraft munitions ==
Name	Image	Origin	OEM	Type	Notes
Integrated autocannons
M61 Vulcan		United States	General Dynamics	Rotary cannon	(20mm), M61A1 variant used on F-16s. Also historically used on F-104 Starfighter.
GSh-23		Soviet Union	KBP	Twin-barrel Autocannon	(23mm) & (30mm), Used on the JF-17s (all variants), J-10 and F-7s.
GSh-30-2		Soviet Union	KBP	Autocannon	(23mm) & (30mm), Used on the JF-17s (all variants), J-10 and F-7s.
DEFA 552		France	DEFA	Revolver cannon	(30mm), Used on Mirage IIIs and Mirage 5s.
NR-30/Type 30-1		Soviet Union; China	Norinco	Autocannon	(30mm), Used on F-7s. Also historically used on the Shenyang F-6.
External gun pods
UKP-23		Soviet Union; China	Norinco	Twin-barrel Autocannon	(23mm), Gun pod version of GSh-23L. Used on K-8.
CC420		France	DEFA	Revolver cannon	(30mm), Gun pod version of DEFA 552. Used on Mirage IIIs and Mirage 5s.
Light Attack Gun Pods		Pakistan	PAC	Machine gun	(7.62 mm), Used on MFI-17 Mushshaks.
Unguided rockets
SNEB		France	Matra	Unguided rocket	(68 mm), Used on Mirage IIIs and Mirage 5s. Also locally built.
Unnamed unguided rockets		Pakistan	PAC	Unguided rocket	(75 mm) & (68 mm), Used on MFI-17 Mushshaks.
Air-to-air missile
Faaz-RF (Under Development)		Pakistan	GIDS / AWC	Beyond-Visual-Range Air-to-Air Missile (BVRAAM)	Active radar-guided variant with a terminal seeker detection range of 25 km. Flight range exceeds 100 km (62 mi) with a maximum speed of Mach 3.5.
Faaz-IIR (Under Development)		Pakistan	GIDS / AWC	Beyond-Visual-Range Air-to-Air Missile (BVRAAM)	Imaging Infrared homing variant equipped with a tracking seeker detection range of 40 km. Overall range exceeds 100 km (62 mi) with a maximum speed of Mach 3.5.
Faaz-2 (Under Development)		Pakistan	GIDS / AWC	Long-range Beyond-Visual-Range Missile (BVR)	Upgraded long-range BVRAAM variant designed with extended propulsion capabilities, boosting total engagement range up to 180 km.
AIM-7 Sparrow		United States	Raytheon	Medium-range Semi-Active Radar Homing	In limited use.
AIM-9 Sidewinder		United States	Raytheon	Short-range Infrared Homing	AIM-9B used historically, AIM-9J,L,P & M variants in use.
AIM-120 AMRAAM		United States	Raytheon	Advanced Medium-Range air-to-air missile, BVR Missile	AIM-120C-5 in use. AIM-120D-3 on order
PL-5EII		China	CAIC	Short-range Infrared Homing	Used by JF-17s.
PL-9		China	Luoyang Electro-Optics Technology Development Centre (EOTDC)	Short-range Infrared Homing	Used by F-7MP/PG
PL-10E		China	CAIC	All-Aspect High Offbore Infrared homing missile	Paired with helmet mounted sight Used by JF-17-Block-III and J10CE.
PL-11		China	SAST	Medium-range Semi-Active Radar Homing	
PL-12		China	Leihua Electronic Technology Research Institute	Medium-range Active Radar Homing, BVR Missile	Arms the JF-17.
PL-15		China	China Airborne Missile Academy (CAMA)	Long-range Active Radar Homing, BVR Missile	Arms the JF-17 Block-III and J-10C.
R.550 Magic		France	Matra / MBDA	Short-range Infrared Homing	
R-Darter		South Africa	Denel Dynamics	Medium-range Active Radar Homing, BVR Missile	
MAA-1 Piranha		Brazil	Mectron	Short-range Infrared Homing	MAA-1B variant
Air-to-surface missile
AGM-88 HARM		United States	Raytheon	Air-to-ground missile	
AGM-65 Maverick		United States	Raytheon	Electro-Optical Guided Missile	
MAR-1		Brazil	Mectron	Anti-Radiation Missile	
AG-300		China	CASIC	Air to ground missile	
CM-400		China	CASIC	Anti-Radiation Supersonic Cruise Missile	
LD-10/SD-10		China	Leihua Electronic Technology Research Institute	Anti-Radiation Missile	
Taimoor		Pakistan	GIDS	Stealthy Air-Launched Cruise Missile	
Ra'ad		Pakistan	NESCOM	Air-Launched Cruise Missile	
Ra'ad-II		Pakistan	NESCOM	Air-Launched Cruise Missile	
Rasoob-250		Pakistan	GIDS / AWC	Stealthy Air-Launched Cruise Missile	
Burq		Pakistan	GIDS	Laser-Guided Anti-Tank Missile	
AZB-81LR		Pakistan	Qaswa Industries / GIDS	Small Diameter Bomb / Precision-Guided Standoff Munition	Precision-guided stand-off bomb equipped with a miniature turbojet engine and deployable folding wings. Guided by a coupled GNSS/INS network and an Imaging Infrared (IIR) terminal homing seeker with an operational flight range up to 200 km. Integrated onto the CAC/PAC JF-17 Thunder and Akıncı UCAV.
KaGeM V3		PakistanTurkey	Baykar / NASTP	Smart Air-Launched Cruise Missile	
MAM-L		Turkey	Roketsan	Semi Active Laser-Guided Missile	
MAM-T		Turkey	Roketsan	Semi Active Laser-Guided Missile	
AS-30L		France	Aérospatiale	Semi Active Laser Homing Missile	In limited use on Mirage-IIIs and Mirage-Vs.
Anti-ship missile
C-802AK		China	CASIC	Anti-ship missile	150 Arms the JF-17's and J-10CE.
CM-400AKG		China	CASIC	Supersonic Anti-ship missile	Arms the JF-17's and J-10CE.
C-705KD		China	CASIC	Anti-ship Infrared Homing Missile	Arms the JF-17's and J-10CE.
AGM-84 Harpoon		United States	McDonnell Douglas / BDS	Anti-ship missile	Arms the JF-17's and J-10CE.
Exocet AM-39		France	Aérospatiale / MBDA	Anti-ship missile	Mirage-VPA3
General-purpose bomb
250 kg Pre-fragmented bomb		Pakistan	Air Weapons Complex	General purpose steel bomb	
PK-81		Pakistan	GIDS	General purpose steel bomb	License made Mark 81.
PK-82		Pakistan	GIDS	General purpose steel bomb	License made Mark 82.
PK-83		Pakistan	GIDS	General purpose steel bomb	License made Mark 83.
PK-84		Pakistan	GIDS	General purpose steel bomb	License made Mark 84.
Mark 84		United States	General Dynamics	General purpose steel bomb	
Cluster bomb
Mk 20 Rockeye II/CBU-100		United States	Textron	Cluster bomb	Used on F-16s & JF-17s.
BL755		United Kingdom	Hunting Aircraft	Cluster bomb	
PSD-1		Pakistan	Air Weapons Complex	Cluster bomb	Based on the Mk 20.
TSD-1		Pakistan	National Defence Complex	Cluster bomb	Based on the Mk 20.
Anti-runway penetration bomb
Matra Durandal		France	Matra	Anti-runway penetration bomb	
HAFR-1		Pakistan	Air Weapons Complex	Anti-runway penetration bomb	
HAFR-2		Pakistan	Air Weapons Complex	Anti-runway penetration bomb	
RPB-1		Pakistan	GIDS	Anti-runway penetration bomb	
Precision-guided munition
H-2 SOW		Pakistan	NESCOM	Glide Bomb	
H-4 SOW		Pakistan	NESCOM	Smart Glide Bomb	Arms the PAF's Mirages and JF-17s.
Al Battaar		Pakistan	GIDS	Laser Guided Bomb	
Takbir		Pakistana	GIDS	Weapons Guidance & Range Extension Kit	
Azb REK		Pakistana	GIDS	Long Range Extension Kit	
SCP-5		Pakistan	GIDS	Bunker Buster Bomb	
I-REK		Pakistan	GIDS	Range Extension Kit	
GBU-10 Paveway II		United States	Raytheon / Lockheed Martin	Laser Guided Bomb	
GBU-12 Paveway II		United States	Raytheon / Lockheed Martin	Laser Guided Bomb	
GBU-16 Paveway II		United States	Raytheon / Lockheed Martin	Laser Guided Bomb	
GBU-24 Paveway III		United States	Raytheon	Laser Guided Bomb	
BLU-109/B		United States	General Dynamics / Lockheed Martin	Bunker Buster Bomb	
GBU-31 JDAM		United States	McDonnell Douglas / BDS	GPS/INS Guidance Kit	
FT PGB		China	China Academy of Launch Vehicle Technology	Glide Bomb	
TG/GB PGB		China	CASC	Laser Guided Bomb	GB-500/GB1; GB-250A/GB3A; GB-6
LT PGB		China	AVIC	Glide Bomb	LT-2
LS PGB		China	AVIC	Glide Bomb	LS-6/500

== Pods ==
Equipment	Image	Origin	OEM	Inducted	Notes
Targeting and Laser Designation Pods
ASELPOD		Turkey	Aselsan	2016	Advanced electro-optical targeting pod integrated as the primary precision-strike support system for the JF-17 Thunder fleet.
Sniper ATP		United States	Lockheed Martin	2010	High-definition FLIR and laser designation pod deployed across the F-16 Fighting Falcon squadrons for precision air-to-surface strikes.
ATLIS II		France	Thomson-CSF	1986	Legacy TV-guided laser-designation pod historically paired with the F-16 and Mirage combat aircraft platforms.
WMD-7		China	AVIC	2010	TV-guided laser-designation pod deployed on JF-17s.
Electronic Warfare and Reconnaissance Pods
Panjnad EW Pod		Pakistan	PAC Kamra / NASTP	2026	Indigenous Digital Radio Frequency Memory (DRFM) airborne self-protection radar-jamming escort pod equipped on the hardpoints of the JF-17 Thunder to mask emissions, conduct SEAD missions, and counter surface-to-air missile threats.
BM/KG300G		China	Catic / CEIEC	2011	Airborne self-protection radar-jamming escort pod equipped on the hardpoints of the JF-17 Thunder to mask emissions and counter surface-to-air missile threats.
AN/ALQ-211 AIDEWS		United States	ITT Exelis / L3Harris	2010	Advanced Integrated Defensive Electronic Warfare Suite pod integrated on the F-16 Block 52 and MLU aircraft configurations.
DB-110		United States	Goodrich Corporation	2010	Long-range, dual-band airborne tactical reconnaissance pod utilized for broad-area standoff imaging and intelligence-gathering missions.
SDT ACMI Pod		Turkey	SDT Space & Defence	2021	Air Combat Maneuvering Instrumentation (ACMI) training pod deployed locally across F-16 and JF-17 units to enable real-time weapon flight simulations and pilot performance evaluations.

== Infantry weapons ==
=== Special Services Wing ===
Image	Name	Type	Origin	OEM	Notes
Pistols
	Glock-17	Semi-automatic pistol	Austria	Glock Ges.m.b.H.	Standard issue sidearm.
	Glock-26	Semi-automatic pistol	Austria	Glock Ges.m.b.H.	Standard issue sidearm.
	FN Five-seven	Semi-automatic pistol	Belgium	FN Herstal	
Submachine guns
	Heckler & Koch MP5	Submachine gun	Germany	Heckler & Koch; Pakistan Ordnance Factories	Locally made variants used. MP-5Kurz and MP-5SD versions also used.
	FN P90	Personal defense weapon	Belgium	FN Herstal	
Assault rifles
	FN F2000	Bullpup AR	Belgium	FN Herstal	Standard issue bullpup rifle.
	Steyr AUG	Bullpup AR	Austria	Steyr Arms	
	M16A1	Assault rifle	United States	Colt	
	Type 56	Assault rifle	China	Norinco	
	M4A1	Carbine	United States	Colt	Standard issue carbine rifle.
Machine guns
	FN Minimi	Squad automatic weapon	Belgium	FN Herstal	
	Rheinmetall MG3	General-purpose machine gun	Germany	Rheinmetall; Pakistan Ordnance Factories	
	FN MAG	General-purpose machine gun	Belgium	FN Herstal	
	Type 81	Light machine gun	China	Norinco	
Sniper rifles
	Barrett M82	Anti-materiel rifle	USA	Barrett	
	Heckler & Koch PSG1	Designated marksman rifle	Germany	Heckler & Koch; Pakistan Ordnance Factories	Also operates local license made PSR-90.
Rotary cannon
	M134/GAU-17/A	Gattling gun	USA	General Electric	

=== Standard Issued Sidearm for Pilots ===
Weapon	Image	Origin	Caliber	Notes
Glock 19/26		Austria	9×19mm Parabellum	
Beretta 92FS		Italy	9×19mm Parabellum	
POF PK-9		Pakistan	9×19mm Parabellum	Locally built Beretta 92.
POF-X		Pakistan	9×19mm Parabellum	Locally built Beretta 92.
POF Sarsilmaz (ST-9)		Pakistan	9×19mm Parabellum	

== Vehicles ==
Image	Name	Origin	OEM	Type	Notes
	International MaxxPro	United States	International Truck	MRAP & Armoured fighting vehicle	Jointly operated with Pakistan Army. Base defense against ground threats.
	ACV-30	Turkey	FNSS Defence Systems	Air Defence platform, Armoured fighting vehicle	Mount the Aselsan Korkut SPAAG/CIWS. Base defense against aerial threats.
	MW-240	Switzerland	MineWolf Systems	Mine Clearance Vehicle	

== Retired Equipment ==
=== Air Defence System ===
Name	Image	Origin	OEM	Type	Notes
HQ-2B Black Arrow		China	China Precision Machinery Import-Export Corporation	Surface to Air missile	10+ Launchers with surplus missiles acquired in 1983. Retired by 2020.

=== Radars ===
Name	Image	Origin	OEM	Type	Notes
Type-13		United Kingdom	Marconi Electronic Systems	Height finder radar	Inducted in 1952 and retired in 1968.
Type-14		United Kingdom	Marconi Electronic Systems	Surveillance radar	Inducted in 1952 and retired in 1968.
Type-15		United Kingdom	Marconi Electronic Systems	Ground Control/Intercept systems	Inducted in 1955.
Type-21		United Kingdom	Marconi Electronic Systems	Tactical control system	Inducted in 1952 and retired in 1968.
HF-200		United Kingdom	Plessey	Height Finder radar	Inducted in 1967.
AR-1		United Kingdom	Plessey	Height Finder radar	6 units acquired between 1968-69.
AR-15		United Kingdom	Plessey	Height Finder radar	Mobile version of AR-1. 3 units acquired in 1973, later retired.
Condor		United Kingdom	Plessey	Height Finder radar	3 radars acquired in 1966-68 which equipped the No. 400, 403 and 410 squadrons. Later retired in 1990 with one of them put on display at the PAF Museum.
FPS-6		United States	General Electric	Height finder radar	One radar inducted in 1959 as part of the MDAP program. Retired after 1965 war.
FPS-20		United States	Bendix Corporation	Surveillance radar	Single unit inducted in 1959 as part of the MDAP program. Replaced with YLC-2 Radar in the early 2000s.
P-35 Saturn		Soviet Union	All-Union Scientific Research Institute of Radio Engineering (VNIIRT)	Surveillance radar	2 units were acquired from the USSR in 1966-1969 time frame. Retired in 1979 due to non-availability of spares from the USSR.

=== Aircraft cannons ===
Name	Image	Origin	OEM	Type	Notes
Colt Mk 12		United States	Colt's Manufacturing Company	Autocannon	Historically used on F-86 Sabres.
M3 Browning		United States	Colt's Manufacturing Company	Autocannon	Historically used on F-86 Sabres.
M39		United States	Ford Motor Company	Revolver cannon	Historically used on the Martin B-57 Canberra.
NR-23/Type 23		Soviet Union; China	Norinco	Autocannon	Historically used on Shenyang F-6s, A-5s, FT-2s and FT-5s.
NL-37		Soviet Union; China	OKB-16	Autocannon	Historically used on FT-2s.
Hispano Mk.V		United Kingdom	Hispano-Suiza	Autocannon	Historically used on the Supermarine Attacker.

=== Unguided Rockets ===
Name	Image	Origin	OEM	Type	Notes
S-5		Soviet Union	OKB-16	Unguided rocket	Historically used on Shenyang F-6s and A-5.
LAU-3/A launcher		United States	U.S. Ordnance	Unguided rocket	Historically used on F-86 Sabre, F-104 Starfighter.

=== Air-to-air Missile ===
Name	Image	Origin	OEM	Type	Notes
AIM-9B		United States	Raytheon	Infrared homing	Historically used on F-86 Sabres, F-104 Starfighter and Shenyang F-6s.
PL-2		China	EOTDC	Infrared homing	Historically used on Shenyang F-6s and A-5s. Copy of K-13 Atoll.
R.530		France	Matra	semi active radar homing and infrared homing	Historically used on the Mirage-IIIEPs.

== See also ==
- List of equipment of the Pakistan Army
- List of equipment of the Pakistan Navy
