= LSR (sniper rifle) =

Light Sniper Rifle (LSR)
- Type: Sniper rifle
- Place of origin: Pakistan

Service history
- In service: 2016-present
- Used by: Pakistan Army; Pakistan Navy

Production history
- Designer: Pakistan Ordnance Factories
- Manufacturer: Pakistan Ordnance Factories
- Unit cost: $6500(FY 2016)

Specifications
- Mass: 5.68 kg
- Caliber: 7.62×51mm NATO
- Action: bolt action
- Muzzle velocity: 800-820 m/s
- Effective firing range: 800 m
- Maximum firing range: 4000m
- Feed system: 5-10 rounds magazine

The Light Sniper Rifle (LSR) is a Pakistani 7.62×51mm bolt-action sniper rifle designed and manufactured by the POF. It was displayed on 23 November 2016 along with the HMG PK-16 in the IDEAS Exhibition. It was designed to fulfill the increasing demand of precision rifles in Pakistan.

== Characteristics ==
The Light Sniper Rifle (LSR) is believed to have been designed to fulfill the demand of an affordable precision rifle platform. The price for one unit is $6500 as of 2016. It is a bolt-action rifle chambered for the 7.62×51mm NATO cartridge and has a weight of 5.68 kg, an effective range of 800 m and Muzzle velocity of 800–820 m/s. It has a Chromium-vanadium steel barrel and is equipped with a quad rail with two forward locking lugs. The rifling has a twist rate of 1:12 and the trigger pull requires 0.5-2.5 kg force. The magazine has a capacity of 5-10 rounds. POF intends to work on extending its range and barrel life after it enters mass-production.

== See also ==
=== Comparable Sniper rifles ===
- Pindad SPR
- Komodo Armament D7CH
- Istiglal anti-materiel rifle
- Yalguzag sniper rifle
- MKEK JNG-90
- T-12 sniper rifle
- Kalekalıp KNT-308
- Siyavash sniper rifle
- Arash (sniper rifle)
- Tabuk Sniper Rifle

=== Other POF products ===
- POF Eye
- HMG PK-16
- Azb sniper rifle
- PSR-90
