= PSR-90 =

Type of Sniper rifle

- Type: Precision rifle
- Place of origin: Pakistan

Production history
- Designer: Pakistan Ordnance Factories
- Manufacturer: Pakistan Ordnance Factories

Specifications
- Mass: 8.1 kg(Without telescope, no magazine)
- Length: 1158 mm
- Barrel length: 600 mm
- Caliber: 7.62×51mm NATO, .308 compatible
- Action: Roller delayed blow back Semi-automatic, Recoil operated
- Muzzle velocity: 870 m/s
- Effective firing range: 1000 m
- Feed system: 5 or 20-rounds detachable box magazine
- Sights: 5.5-22×50 NXS telescopic sight; also compatible with 6×42 telescopic sight

The PSR-90 (Precision Sniper Rifle) is a Pakistani semi-automatic 7.62×51mm precision rifle designed and manufactured by Pakistan Ordnance Factories.

The PSR-90 is considered a variant of the H&K PSG1. It is not described as a licensed copy, however. it is only said to be "inspired by" the PSG1.

== Design ==
The PSR-90 is a semi-automatic firearm with Roller delayed blowback operation, much like the PSG-1 it is based on. It fires the 7.62×51mm cartridge and can also fire .308 rounds. The PSR-90 can accept either a 5 or 20 round magazine. It has a weight of 8.1 kg with an overall length of 1158 mm. The rifle has a polygonaly rifled barrel with a length of 600 mm, and 4 grooves with a right-hand twist for rifling. The PSR-90 has a fully adjustable stock.

The PSR-90 has a muzzle velocity of 870 m/s with a maximum effective range of 1000 m. The PSR-90 is capable of shooting a 90 mm group at a distance of 300 m (1 MOA). A modified trigger with a pull of 1.6 kg is available optionally.

=== Accessories ===
The sniper rifle is generally operated with a 5.5-22×50 NXS sight but a 6×42 telescopic sight can be used instead. A silencer, a telescopic sight and a carrying sling are all available.

== Operators ==
- Pakistan: Pakistan Army/Pakistan Navy.
- Vietnam: Vietnam People's Army and Vietnam People's Public Security

== See also ==
=== Comparable Sniper rifles ===
- Pindad SPR
- Komodo Armament D7CH
- Istiglal anti-materiel rifle
- Yalguzag sniper rifle
- MKEK JNG-90
- T-12 sniper rifle
- Kalekalıp KNT-308
- Siyavash sniper rifle
- Arash (sniper rifle)
- Tabuk Sniper Rifle

=== Other POF products ===
- POF Eye
- HMG PK-16
- LSR
- Azb sniper rifle
