= Azb DMR MK1 =

Designated marksman rifle

- Type: Designated marksman rifle
- Place of origin: Pakistan

Service history
- In service: 2014-Present
- Used by: Pakistan Army; Pakistan Navy
- Wars: War in North-West Pakistan -Operation Zarb-e-Azb

Production history
- Designer: Pakistan Ordnance Factories
- Manufacturer: Pakistan Ordnance Factories

Specifications
- Mass: 4.94 kg(Without Magazine)
- Length: 1055 mm
- Barrel length: 508 mm
- Caliber: 7.62×51mm NATO
- Action: Roller locked delayed blow back, Semi-automatic
- Effective firing range: 600 metres (660 yd)
- Feed system: 5/20 Rounds Magazine
- Sights: Telescopic sight

The Azb DMR MK1 or Azb MK1 is a Pakistani light weight semi-automatic designated marksman rifle designed and manufactured by the POF. It was first unveiled at the December 2014 IDEAS exhibition. It is believed to be named after the counter-terrorist operation in North-West Pakistan Operation Zarb-e-Azb which had just been commenced at the time the sniper rifle was introduced. It itself was designed for the low intensity operations that were occurring during its time. The rifle has taken part in many international defence exhibitions and has been offered for export.

== Characteristics ==
The Azb sniper rifle is comparatively light weight, medium-range, cost-effective and easy to produce. According to some sources it is made from G3 parts and is therefore compatible and interchangeable with it. It is compatible with multiple optical sights, thermal optics and night-vision device. It is a semi-automatic designated marksman rifle/sniper rifle/service rifle featuring a 20 inch cold hammer forged match grade bull barrel. It is chambered in 7.62×51mm NATO, operates a roller locked delayed blowback mechanism with a 5/20 rounds capacity magazine, has an overall length of 1055 mm with a 508 mm long barrel, weighs 4.94 kg without the magazine and has a plastic fixed butt stock. It can engage multiple targets at a maximum range of 600 m with an accuracy of 2 MOA at a range of 100 m.

== Operators ==
- Pakistan
  - Pakistan Army
  - Pakistan Navy

== See also ==
=== Comparable Sniper rifles ===
- Pindad SPR
- Komodo Armament D7CH
- Istiglal anti-materiel rifle
- Yalguzag sniper rifle
- MKEK JNG-90
- T-12 sniper rifle
- Kalekalıp KNT-308
- Siyavash sniper rifle
- Arash (sniper rifle)
- Tabuk Sniper Rifle
- CAR 817 DMR

=== Other POF products ===
- POF Eye
- HMG PK-16
- LSR
- PSR-90
