= List of products of Pakistan Ordnance Factories =

The Pakistan Ordnance Factories (commonly abbreviated as POF) is a state-owned weapons manufacturer headquartered in Wah Cantt, Punjab, Pakistan. The POF produces commercial and military products including automatic rifles, pistols, bolt-action rifles, machine guns, mortars, artillery ammunition, aircraft ammunitation, anti-aircraft ammunition, tank amuunitation, anti-tank ammunition, bombs, grenades, land mines, pyrotechnics, ammunition, rockets, missiles, explosives, propellants, detonators, chemicals and military tactical gear. The POF produces ammunition & armaments hat meets requirements set by NATO specification.

== Infantry weapons ==
=== Pistols ===
- POF-4 – 9mm calibre pistol (Semi-auto version of SMG-PK)
- POF-5 – 9mm calibre pistol (Semi-auto version of HK MP5)

=== Sub-machine guns ===
- HK MP5 – 9mm calibre sub-machine gun produced under license. Variants produced: MP5A2, MP5P3.
- SMG-PK – 9mm calibre compact machine pistol. Variants produced: PK1.

=== Assault rifles ===
- HK G3 – 7.62×51mm calibre battle rifle, produced under license. Variants produced: G3A3, G3P4.

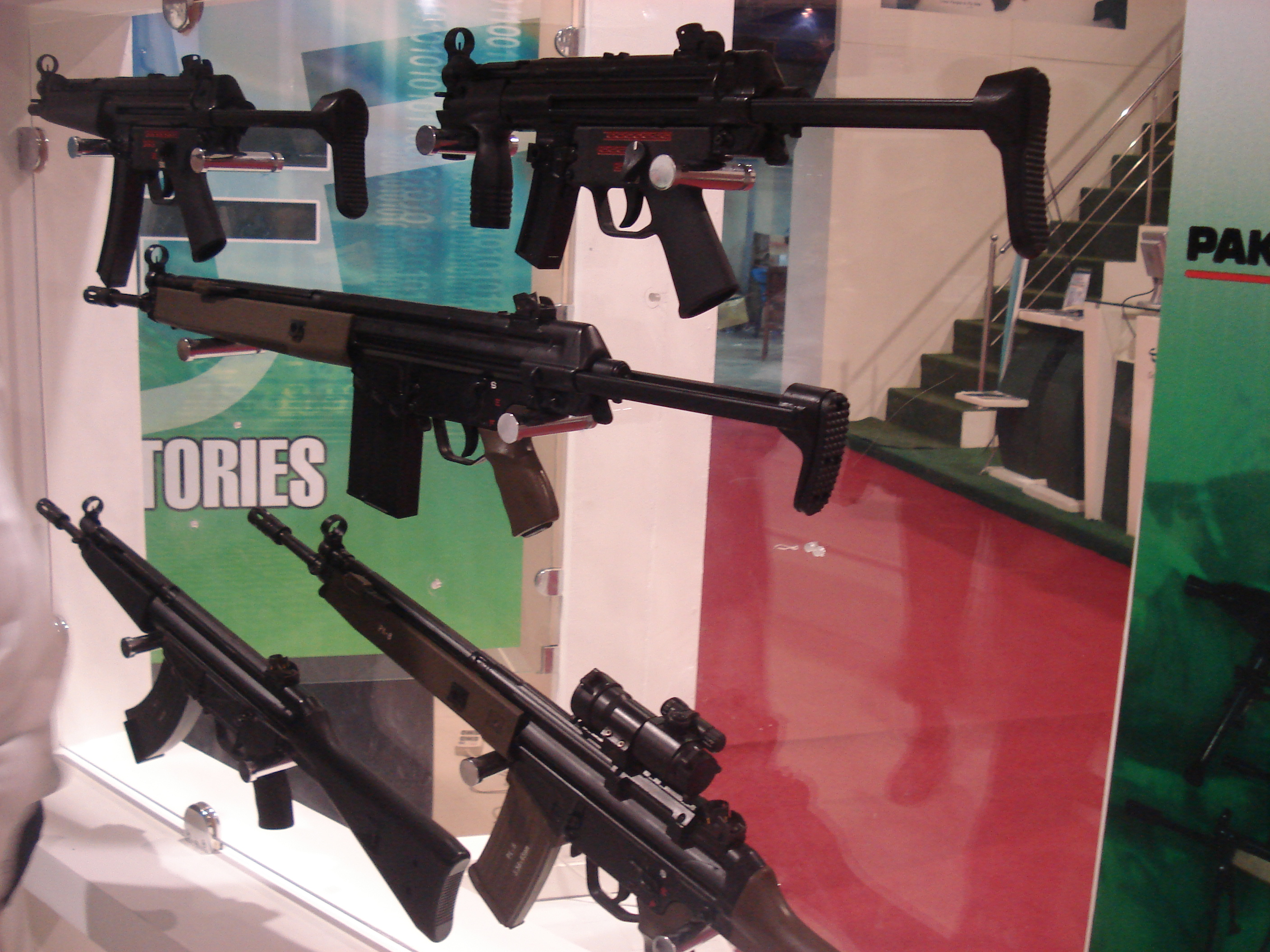
Several HK MP5 and HK G3 variants produced by POF on display at an exhibition

=== Precision rifles ===
- Azb DMR MK1 – 7.62×51mm calibre designated marksman rifle.
- PSR-90 – 7.62×51mm calibre sniper rifle, an indigenous variant of the HK MSG-90.
- Light Sniper Rifle (LSR) – .308 Winchester calibre bolt action sniper rifle.

=== Machine guns ===
- MG 3 – 7.62×51mm NATO calibre general purpose machine gun, produced under license.
- HMG PK-16 – 12.7×108mm calibre heavy machine gun, modified (Type 54P).
- Type 54P – 12.7×108mm calibre heavy machine gun (DShK variant), produced under license.

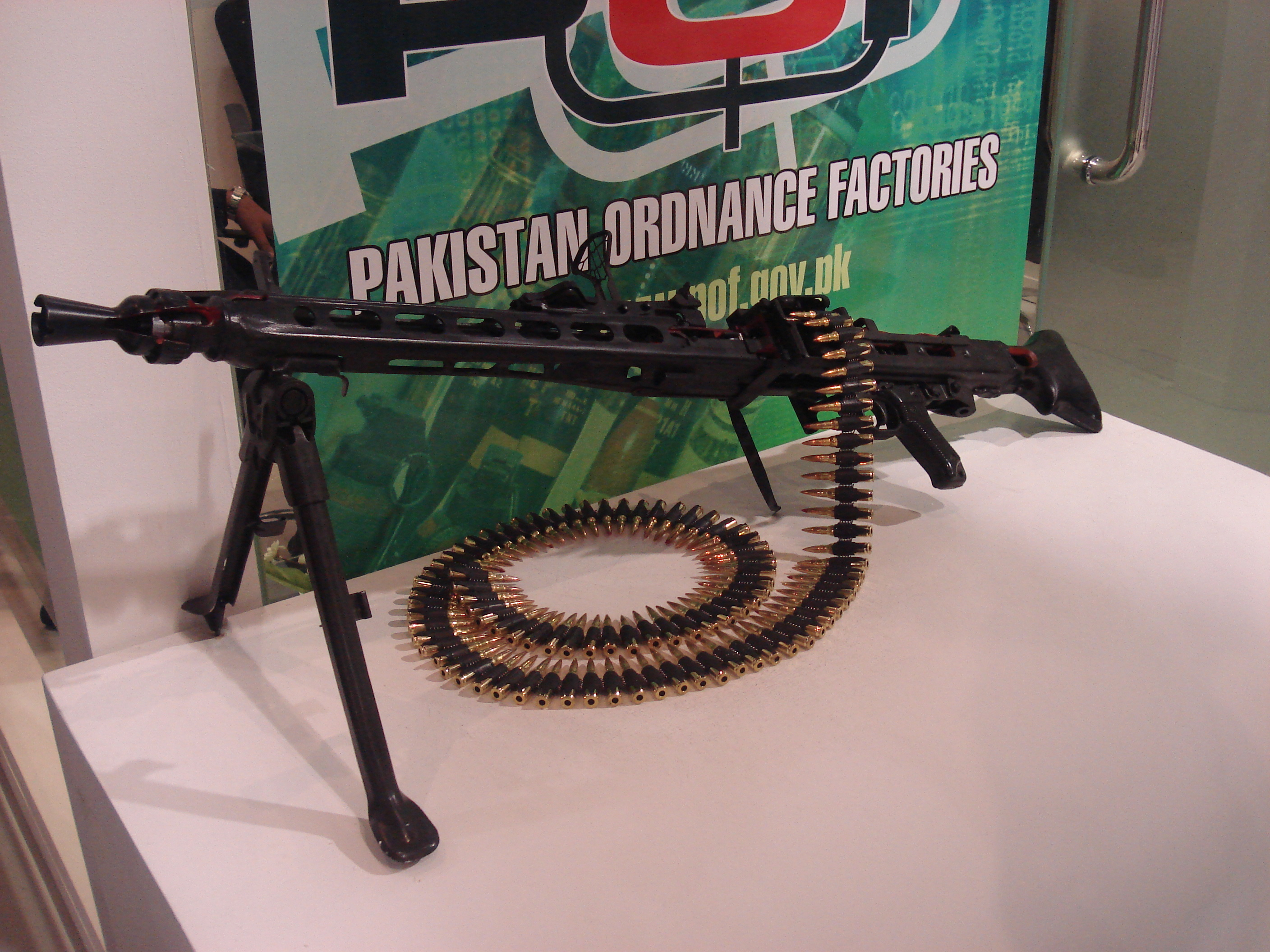
The Rheinmetall MG 3 machine gun, produced under license by POF, on display at the IDEAS 2008 Defense Exhibition in Karachi, Pakistan

=== Civilian/Sporting rifles ===
- .308 Win Sporter – .308 Winchester calibre sporting/hunting sniper rifle.
- G3S – 7.62×51 mm calibre civilian semi auto irreversible version of the G3A3, with shorter barrel length.

=== POF Eye ===
POF Eye is a special-purpose hand-held weapon system similar in concept to the CornerShot that can fire weapons around corners. It was first revealed at the 5th International Defence Exhibition and Seminar (IDEAS 2008), held at the Karachi Expo Centre in November 2008. It is designed for SWAT and special forces teams in hostile situations, particularly counter-terrorism and hostage rescue operations. It allows its operator to both see and attack an armed target without exposing the operator to counter-attack.

=== Under-development / Under-trial Assault rifles ===
- BW-20 series
  - BW-20 – 7.62×51mm calibre new indigenous battle rifle & replacement of HK G3. BW-20 has some similarities with the G3 (around 30%) with the intention to keep manufacturing costs low, however the BW-20 is not an upgrade of the G3. It is a new rifle with an apparent focus on modularity and interchangeability of parts. POF is also reportedly working on 5.56×45mm and 7.62×39mm versions of the BW-20.
  - BW-21 – 7.62×51mm calibre new indigenous battle rifle & replacement of HK G3. Based on the BW-20, it follows AR-style ergonomics more closely.
  - CW-39 – 7.62×39mm calibre new indigenous assault rifle & replacement of Type 56. Design is based on BW-20 and will be compatible with AK magazines.
  - CW-56 – 5.56×45mm calibre new indigenous assault rifle which is based on BW-20 rifle.

=== Status unclear ===
- PK-20 series
  - PK-18 – 7.62×51mm calibre (Based on ArmaLite AR-10A), status is unclear or cancelled.
  - PK-21 – 7.62×39mm calibre (Based on AK-103), status is unclear or cancelled.

== Ammunition ==
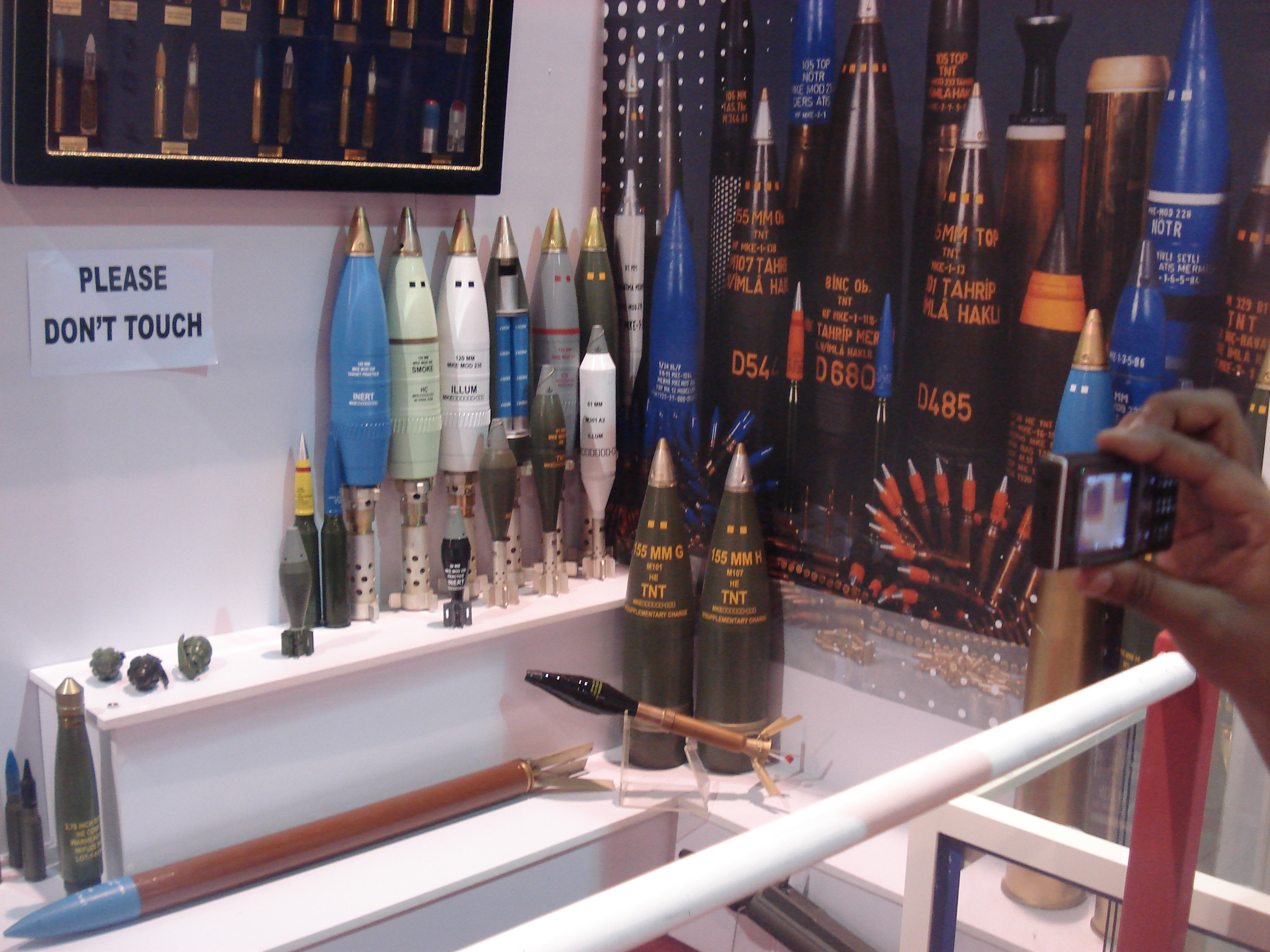
A variety of grenades, artillery shells, mortar shells and other ammunition produced by POF, on display at the IDEAS 2008 Defence Exhibition in Karachi, Pakistan.

=== Small arms ammunition ===
- 9x19mm Parabellum
- 5.56×45mm NATO
- 7.62×39mm Soviet
- 7.62×51mm NATO
- 7.62×54mmR Soviet
- 12 Gauge Shaheen Cartridges - include shot numbers from 4 to 9. Moreover, 7 Trap, 9 Skeet, Buck shots, SG, LG, BB and AAA used for hunting & clay pigeon shooting.

=== Anti-aircraft and aircraft ammunition ===
- 12.7x99mm NATO
- 12.7x108mm Soviet
- 14.5x114mm Soviet
- 20mm phalanx
- 23mm
- 30mm
- 35mm
- 37mm
- 57mm
- Bomb HE AC 500 lb (250 kg)
- Bomb HE AC 1000 lb (500 kg)

=== Anti-tank and tank ammunition ===
- 40mm (RPG-7P/7AP)
- 73mm (SPG-9)
- 100mm
- 105mm
- 106mm
- 125mm

=== Artillery ammunition ===
- 88 mm howitzer
- 105mm howitzer
- 122mm howitzer
- 130mm howitzer
- 155mm howitzer
- 203mm howitzer

=== Anti-submarine ammunition ===
- Depth charge Mark II Mod 3

== Explosives ==
=== Grenades ===
- ARGES 84 P2A1: Fragmentation grenade
- Discharger P3 MK1: Smoke discharge/grenade
- Target Indication MK2: Targeting smoke grenade
- Fuzes, Detonators & Primers
- Demolition Stores

=== Mortars ===
- 60mm mortar/smoke/illuminating signal
- 81mm mortar/smoke/illuminating signal
- 120mm mortar/smoke

=== Rockets ===
- 122mm YARMUK Rocket

== See also ==
- Pakistan Ordinance Factories
- Defence Production of Pakistan
- Ministry of Defence Production
- List of military equipment manufactured in Pakistan
