= Special Security Unit =

Pakistani counter-terrorism agency

- Common name: Special Security Unit (SSU)
- Abbreviation: SSU
- Motto: Proud to Protect

Agency overview
- Formed: 7 July 2010
- Employees: 3,000

Jurisdictional structure
- Operations jurisdiction: Sindh, Pakistan
- Area: 140,914 sq. km.
- Population: 46.3 Million
- Legal jurisdiction: Sindh
- Governing body: Government of Sindh
- General nature: Civilian police

Operational structure
- Headquarters: Karachi, Sindh
- Agency executive: Maqsood Ahmed., Deputy Inspector General of Police (DIGP)/Commandant
- Parent agency: Sindh Police

Website
- www.ssusindhpolice.gos.pk

The Special Security Unit (SSU) is a specialized counterterrorism and security unit of the Sindh Police in Pakistan. It is a Karachi-based unit, with its operational jurisdiction extending throughout the province of Sindh. It was established in 2010 in response to increased rates of terrorism. The unit reports to the IG Sindh and DIGP Security/Commandant Mr. Maqsood Ahmed is the founding head of the unit.

== Services ==
The SSU provides personal protection to individuals in the following roles:

- President of Pakistan
- Prime Minister of Pakistan
- Chairman of the Senate of Pakistan
- Speaker of the National Assembly of Pakistan
- Chief Justice of Pakistan
- Visiting heads of state and/or government
- Governors, Chief Ministers and Chief Secretaries of the provinces of Pakistan and of Azad Kashmir
- Mayor Karachi
- Home Secretary Sindh

The immediate family members of senior government officials of Sindh such as the Chief Minister, Chief Secretary, Home Secretary and other top executives get SSU protection due to high risk threats.

The SSU also provides security arrangements for ceremonies and public events, carrying out threat level assessment, risk assessment inquiry, and security surveys.

== History ==
=== Establishment ===
Centralized Security Headquarter (CSH) was formed on 31 July 2008 with the aim to provide security to important personalities and institutions.

On 7 April 2010, the CSH was reorganized to ensure effective span of command and supervision, along with the creation of post SP Security-I to provide security to important personalities.

It was reorganized in light of the ambition of SP Maqsood Ahmed to execute the security issues to initiate a change culture in the police unit.

Additionally, on 7 July 2010, SSU was formed to handle the security issues on a provincial level. The post of SP Security-I was renamed as AIGP Security Sindh and positioned under the Inspector General of Police, Sindh.

== Selection ==
In 2013, SSU began recruiting new candidates. The aspirants for the SSU, existing or external candidates (new), are required to pass a certain set of assessments which are aimed at determining their suitability and fitness.

The maximum age limit for existing police personnel is 45 years, and 35 years for officers and soldiers respectively, while for the external candidates, the age limit is 28 years.

The standard height required for external male and female candidates is 5’.6" and 5’.4" respectively; however, candidates with greater height and built-up physique are given preference.

The National Testing Service (NTS) conducts the screening test to recruit the new candidates that made the process transparent. After the NTS test, the selected candidates appear in the physical and psychological test.

Further, the interviews are conducted to check the suitability and competency of the selected candidates.

=== Training ===
After the completion of the recruitment process, the recruited police personnel join the SSU.

The personnel are sent to specified training institution for training course to enhance an integrated response mechanism against terrorism at National level.

The training programs are initiated at the Shaheed Benazir Bhutto Elite Police Training Center Razzakabad, Karachi through the Police personnel appointments, and are advanced to the anti-terrorism unit.

The following Courses are taken by the personnel:

- Elite Police Course (Police Commando Course), follow a similar training module like of Pakistan Army's Special Services Group (SSG)
- VIP Protection Course

== Uniform ==
The SSU personnel wear a black outfit, protective gears, and M-4 rifle. The regular SSU uniform consists of black trouser and full-sleeve shirt, black barrette representing the SSU logo and DMS shoes.

The shirt is ornamented with the rank and training badge, and arm badge of the SSU placed on the upper part of the left sleeve.

The operational uniform of the SSU comprises black trouser, black T-shirt or polo shirt with SSU logo printed on the front left side, along with the name of the unit the back side, P-Cap displaying SSU logo and DMS shoes.

== Activities ==
SSU had played an active role in counterterrorism and special operations in Pakistan. Incident in which it was involved included:

- June 2014, a multi-agency operation against Islamic Movement of Uzbekistan, at Karachi Airport.
- January 2023, attack on Karachi Police Office by the Pakistani Taliban. The Special Security Unit broke the siege against the terrorists of the TTP.

== Equipment ==
All SSU personnel wear a bulletproof jacket, helmet, and other body protective gears when on operational duty.

=== Small arms ===
Model	Type	Origin	References
Glock	Semi-automatic pistol	Austria	
Beretta 92FS	Semi-automatic pistol	Italy	
Benelli M4	Shotgun	Italy	
Heckler & Koch MP5	Submachine gun	Germany	
M4 carbine	Assault rifle	United States	
Type 56	Assault rifle	China	
Beretta ARX160	Assault rifle	Italy	
HK G3	Assault rifle	Pakistan	
PSR-90	Sniper rifle	Pakistan	
MG3	Machine gun	Pakistan	

=== Miscellaneous ===
- POF Eye
- Hand Grenades
- Smoke Grenades
- Binoculars
- Night vision goggles

== Initiatives ==
The SSU established Pakistan's first SWAT team. As of 2016, 50 specialized police personnel (commandos) have been trained to support the efforts of police in critical situations.

== Public training ==
In 2015, the SSU established the Hostile Environment Awareness Training (HEAT) program, intended to teach civilians how to respond during terrorist attacks.
