= HMG PK-16 =

Pakistani Heavy Machine Gun

- Type: Heavy machine gun
- Place of origin: Pakistan

Service history
- In service: November 2016-present
- Used by: Pakistan

Production history
- Designer: POF
- Manufacturer: POF

Specifications
- Mass: 30±2 kg
- Length: 1,500 mm
- Barrel length: 1,003 mm
- Width: 520 mm
- Crew: 2
- Caliber: 12.7×108mm
- Action: Gas operated
- Rate of fire: 540-600 rounds/min
- Muzzle velocity: 810 m/s
- Effective firing range: 1,500-1,600 m
- Feed system: Ammunition belt

The HMG PK-16 is a Pakistani belt-fed air-cooled gas-operated heavy machine gun designed and produced by the Pakistan Ordnance Factories. It was first unveiled on 23 November 2016 on the IDEAS defence exhibition. Its name might suggest its introduction in 2016.

== Characteristics ==
The HMG PK-16 shows some similarities to the Soviet DShK, as well as the Chinese W85 and Type 54 Machine gun. The HMG PK-16 is assembled by two people with an assembling time of 5 minutes and 20 seconds and a disassembling time of 4 minutes and 30 seconds, however its assembling time with the gun mounted is less than one minute. It has spade grips with the trigger in between the spade grips to be thumb pressed by the user. It has a tripod stand that can be operated either flat on ground or elevated. It can also be operated on vehicles. It is a comparatively light weight and suitable for low intensity operations. It operates with a caliber of 12.7×108mm with overall length of 1,500 mm and barrel length of 1,003 mm. It has an effective range of 1,500-1,600 m. Its tripod allows for an elevation of -26° to + 73° and a traverse movement of 360°. It fires 540-600 rounds per minute with each bullet traveling at speed of 810 m/s. The barrel however must be changed after firing 3,500 rounds.

== See also ==
=== Other HMGs ===
- Type 77 heavy machine gun
- Zastava M87
- QJZ-89

=== Other POF Products ===
- POF Eye
- Azb sniper rifle
- LSR
- PSR-90
