= Air Defence Command =

Air Defence Command may refer to:

- Air Defence Command (India), proposed Indian Armed Forces command
- Air Defense Command (Israel)
- Air Defence Command (Pakistan), Pakistan Air Force
- Air and Coastal Defense Command, Thailand air defence command
- Joint Ground-based Air Defence Command, Netherlands air defence command

Former commands

- Air Defence Command (Canada) (1951–1975)
- Air Defence of Great Britain (1925-1936), a Royal Air Force command
- Air Defense Command, United States Air Force, 1946-68
- Continental Air Defense Command, US

== See also ==
- Air Command (disambiguation)
- Defence Command (disambiguation)
