= Air command =

Air command is a term used to refer to the command structure of some air forces. Examples include:

- Allied Air Command (NATO)
- Royal Canadian Air Force, known as Air Command from 1968 to 2011
- RAAF Air Command (Australia)
- RAF Air Command (United Kingdom)
- Air Combat Command (United States Air Force)
- Air Defence Command (disambiguation)

== See also ==
- List of major commands of the United States Air Force, includes several historical air commands
- Air Command International, an American gyrocopter manufacturer
