= Defence Command =

The term Defence Command means the joint military headquarters in some countries. For more information, see

- Defence Command (Denmark)
- Defence Command (Finland)
- Pyongyang Defense Command

== See also ==
- Air Defence Command (disambiguation)
