= YIHA-III =

Loitering munition

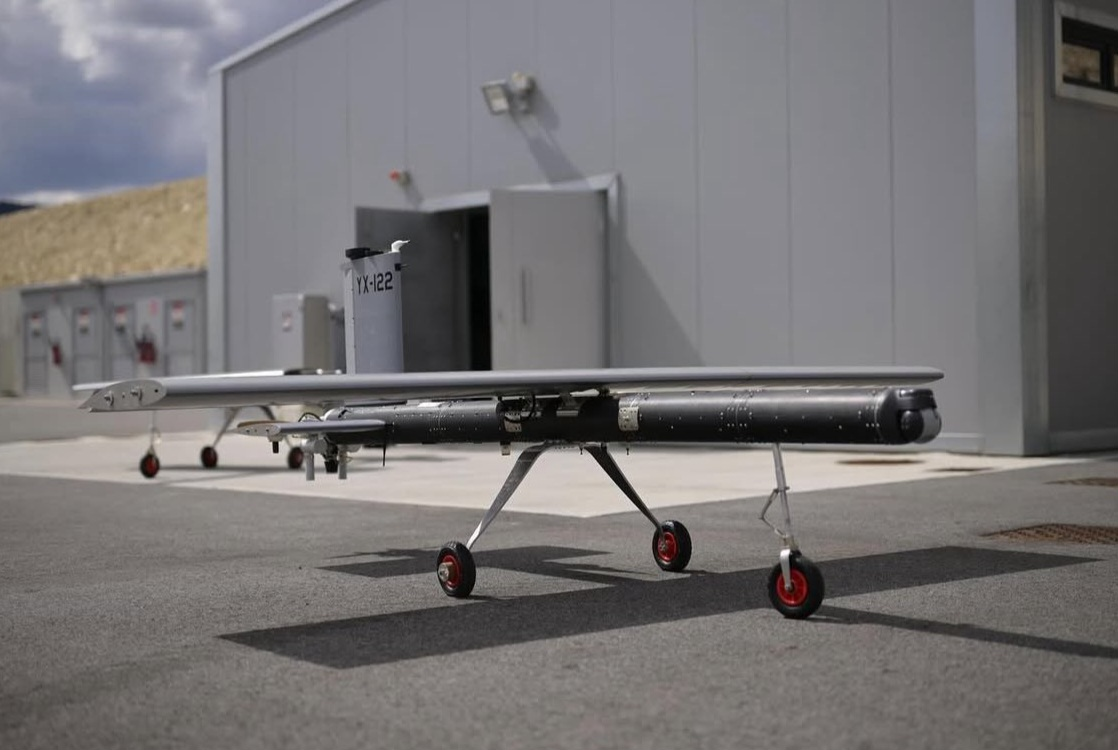
- YIHA-III at the Kuçovë Air Base in Albania.

General information
- Type: UAV
- Role: Loitering munition
- National origin: Turkey; Pakistan
- Manufacturer: Baykar; NASTP
- Status: In service
- Primary users: Turkey; Pakistan Albania; Ukraine; Sudan
- Number built: Unknown

History
- In service: Since 2023

The YIHA-III, also known as Sivrisinek (Turkish: Mosquito), is a Turkish-Pakistani low-cost, high-precision unmanned aerial vehicle and loitering munition developed jointly by Baykar and NASTP.

== History ==
The existence of the YIHA-III was first unveiled in 2023 during a visit by the Commander of the Turkish Air Force at the NASTP Alpha facility in Rawalpindi. However, scarce public information was available on it. The drone eventually came into public view in early 2024 after reports emerged of "mystery drones" which were sighted striking Russian military infrastructure in Belgorod during the war in Ukraine. It was officially revealed by Baykar at the SAHA 2026 defence exhibition.

== Design ==
The YIHA features an UMTAS ATGM warhead fitted to a tubular body with a fixed tricycle style landing gear which enables it to launch from a runway as well as a catapult system. After launch, the drone can loiter in the air, detecting a target, and then attack it from the air with a vertical dive. The drone can also be used in swarm mode. It uses a small piston engine driving a pusher propeller, fixed wheeled undercarriage, and a gimbaled electro-optical (EO) camera on its nose that enables the operator to find targets during flight. It is designed to operate at extended range, flying at altitudes of up to 4,000 ft with a service ceiling of 10,000 ft.

The drone is produced in two variants: the UM variant is a simplified, lower-cost variant with communications ranging out to 10 km+, a flight time of 9+ hours and a maximum operational range of 1,000 km, according to Baykar. The UMX is an enhanced variant with AI-enabled guidance and improved data connectivity with command and control (C2) elements. The UMX is designed to relay communications via other Baykar UAVs including the TB2, TB3 and Akıncı. This includes the transmission of video links and digital data, providing a secondary intelligence, surveillance and reconnaissance (ISR) capability during flight. The UMX variant can maintain communications and engage ‘fire-and-forget' mode at ranges of over 80 km, however its maximum operational range is shorter than the UM variant at 900 km. The UMX has an AI-assisted EO camera, which provides an additional terminal guidance capability on top of the global navigation satellite services (GNSS) guidance employed by the UM variant. Both variants have top cruising speeds of 102 km/h, with a maximum speed of 130 km/h likely achieved during the terminal flight phase.

== Combat use ==
=== Russo-Ukraine war ===
In February 2024, reports emerged of a "mystery drone" used by Ukrainian forces to strike targets inside the Russian city of Belgorod, which is approximately 40 km from the Ukrainian border. Further analysis of pictures of the drone's debris later revealed it was a YIHA-III.

=== Syrian civil war ===
The Turkish military has utilized the YIHA drone against High-value targets during operations in Northern Syria.

=== Pakistan ===
The YIHA drones in service with the Pakistan Air Force have been deployed in anti-terrorist operations in Balochistan and Khyber Paktunkhwa. In 2024, the Pakistan Armed Forces carried out Operation Marg Bar Sarmachar in which they targeted terrorist hideouts located in Iran's Sistan and Baluchestan Province.

In May 2025, many YIHA drones were deployed in combat missions against various Indian military targets both in Indian Administered Kashmir and mainland India as part of Operation Bunyan-un-Marsoos.

In February and March 2026, YIHA-III loitering munitions were deployed against military bases of the Islamic Emirate of Afghanistan during Operation Ghazab-lil-Haq.

=== Democratic Republic of the Congo ===
Between January 21 and February 1, 2026, Bangoka International Airport, located outside Kisangani, in the Democratic Republic of the Congo, was targeted by multiple loitering munitions launched by the March 23 Movement. Debris recovered from the scene were consistent with YIHA drones. It is believed that the drones were supplied by the Rwandan Defence Forces. The Armed Forces of the Democratic Republic of the Congo (Forces armées de la République démocratique du Congo: FARDC) subsequently shot down two more loitering munitions near the village of Mikenge, Nord Kivu province, on 10 March 2026 which suggested widespread usage with M23.

== Operators ==
- Pakistan: Locally manufactures the drone. Operationalized with the airforce in early 2024 at PAF Base Murid.
  - Pakistan Air Force
- Albania: In October 2024, Albania's PM Edi Rama said Turkey would donate kamikaze drones, emphasizing Albania would not use them to attack. In March 2025, the Albanian Air Force began operating the Byker YIHA-III, first deployed at Kuçovë.
  - Albanian Air Force
- Turkey
- Ukraine: Unknown units acquired in early 2024.
- Sudan: Unknown units were provided by Turkey.
- Uzbekistan seen in a video of the Uzbekistan air force showing their military drone capabilities
- Azerbaijan: Azerbaijan’s army in the Nakhchivan exclave has received YIHA-III kamikaze drones.

=== Alleged users ===
- March 23 Movement

== Specifications ==
General characteristics

- Powerplant: 1 × DLE-170 Internal Combustion Engine

Performance Armament

- 1 × 35 kg OMTAS high-explosive warhead

== See also ==
- AeroVironment Switchblade
- HESA Shahed 136
- ZALA Kub-BLA
