= Heckler & Koch PSG1 =

Designated marksman rifle

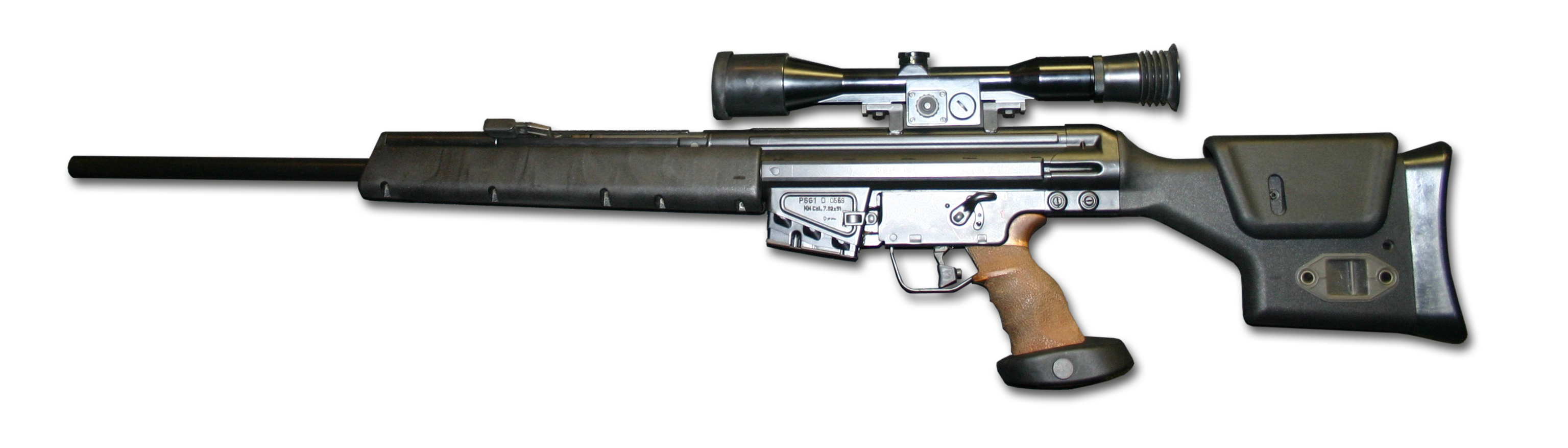
- PSG1
- Type: Designated marksman rifle Sniper rifle
- Place of origin: West Germany

Service history
- In service: 1972–present
- Used by: See Users
- Wars: Lebanese Civil War; War in Iraq (2013–2017); Yemeni Civil War (2015–present); Saudi Arabian-led intervention in Yemen; Insurgency in Jammu and Kashmir; Russian invasion of Ukraine

Production history
- Designer: Heckler & Koch
- Designed: 1968
- Manufacturer: Heckler & Koch; SEDENA (licensed)
- Produced: 1972–2014
- Variants: PSG1A1; MSG90

Specifications
- Mass: 7.2 kg (15.87 lb)
- Length: 1,230 mm (48.4 in)
- Barrel length: 650 mm (25.6 in)
- Width: 59 mm (2.3 in)
- Height: 258 mm (10.2 in) with telescopic sight
- Cartridge: 7.62×51mm NATO
- Action: Roller-delayed blowback
- Muzzle velocity: 868 m/s (2,848 ft/s) (Note: Bullet velocities are highly variable as this metric is dependent on bullet weight and both the powder used and the weight of the powder charge. The velocity shown above is only a representative sample measurement.)
- Effective firing range: 1,000 m (1,094 yd)
- Maximum firing range: 1000 meters
- Feed system: 5, 10 or 20-round detachable box magazine. 50 round drum also compatible.
- Sights: Hensoldt ZF 6×42 PSG1 telescopic sight with illuminated reticle

The Heckler & Koch PSG1 (Präzisionsschützengewehr, German for "precision marksman rifle") is a semi-automatic sniper rifle/designated marksman rifle designed and produced by the German company Heckler & Koch.

== Development ==
This rifle is said to have been developed in response to the Munich massacre at the 1972 Summer Olympics. The West German police units at the time lacked the precision shooting capability to effectively neutralize the terrorists to prevent the hostages being killed. H&K was then commissioned to create a high-accuracy, large-magazine capacity, semi-automatic rifle for law enforcement and military use.

== Design details ==
The PSG1 is mechanically based on the Heckler & Koch G3 battle rifle that employs a roller-delayed blowback operating system. Its shot-to-shot variation is expected to be better than 1 minute of angle (MOA) with match ammunition. This level of accuracy is only average compared to most modern bolt action sniper rifles, but is still exceptional for a semi-automatic rifle and at one time was claimed to be "one of the most accurate semi-automatic sniper rifles in the world."

The rifle has a strengthened receiver with rails welded over the channels where a retractable buttstock would slide and features numerous other upgrades and such to meet the necessities of police sniper units. The two sliding locking rollers that hold the bolt in battery during firing are not cylindrical shaped like in normal G3 rifles, but semi-cylindrical shaped to offer a non-random more precise positioning on corresponding flat surfaces in the barrel extension locking recesses. The PSG1 also features a low-noise bolt closing device (similar to the forward assist on many M16 rifles).

PSG1s are not supplied with iron sights but come equipped with the Hensoldt ZF 6×42 PSG1 scope with an illuminated reticle. The scope has a built-in bullet drop compensation range adjustment feature which can be adjusted from 100 to 600 m.

It has a heavy free-floating barrel with polygonal rifling and an adjustable stock. The stock is of high impact matte black plastic and has a high degree of adjustment. It is adjustable for length, and includes a pivoting butt cap and a vertically-adjustable cheekpiece. The forend is fitted with a T-way rail for sling swivel or tripod.

The rifle also features a removable and adjustable trigger unit, for further individual fitting of the rifle. The trigger pull can be modified and the whole assembly is removable from the pistol grip. The pistol grip is of a target-style with an adjustable palm shelf.

=== PSG1A1 ===
The PSG1A1 variant was introduced by Heckler & Koch in 2006, and features two major improvements. First, the cocking handle was relocated a couple of degrees counter-clockwise. This was because when locked rearward, it could physically interfere with the long scopes often used on the rifles. The second modification involved the replacement of the outdated Hensoldt scope. Non-police users often found the scope's 600 m range limitation and simple crosshairs inadequate for their needs. In addition, the rechargeable batteries are difficult to recharge and for which to find replacements. A final fault is that Hensoldt does not service the scope in the United States. For these reasons, the PSG1A1 has been outfitted with a Schmidt & Bender 3–12×50 Police Marksman II scope, mounted on 34 mm (1.3 in) rings. To remedy brass ejection a brass catcher must be installed.

== MSG90 ==
Heckler & Koch MSG90
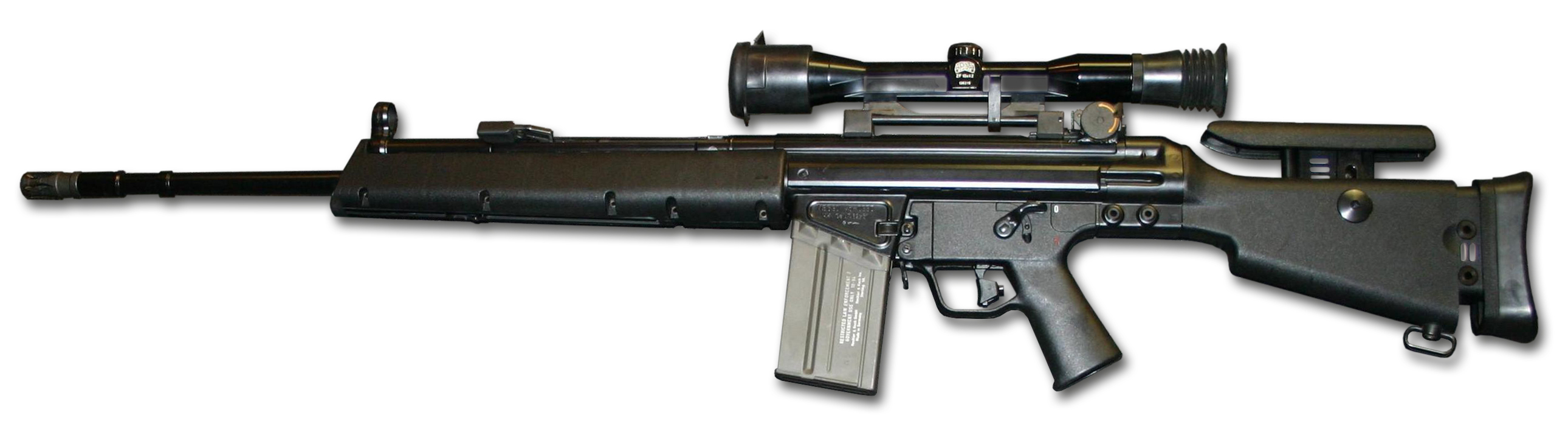
- Type: Designated marksman rifle
- Place of origin: Germany

Service history
- In service: 1990–present
- Used by: See Users

Production history
- Designer: Heckler & Koch
- Designed: 1987
- Manufacturer: Heckler & Koch
- Produced: 1990–2021
- Variants: MSG90A1; MSG90A2

Specifications
- Mass: 6.3 kg (13.89 lb)
- Length: 1,230 mm (48.4 in)
- Barrel length: 600 mm (23.6 in)
- Width: 59 mm (2.3 in)
- Height: 258 mm (10.2 in) with telescopic sight
- Cartridge: 7.62×51mm NATO
- Action: Roller-delayed blowback
- Muzzle velocity: 868 m/s (2,848 ft/s)
- Maximum firing range: 1200 meters
- Feed system: 5 or 20-round magazine
- Sights: Hensoldt ZF 6×42 PSG1 telescopic sight with illuminated reticle

The MSG90 (Militärisches Scharfschützengewehr, German for "militarized sharp-shooting rifle") is a militarized variant of the PSG1 that is both strengthened and lightened while less expensive. Compared to the PSG1 which is regarded as a pure sniper rifle, the MSG90 can fill the role of a designated marksman rifle.

The PSG1 and MSG90 have different trigger packs. The MSG90 uses a modified version of the push pin trigger packs of H&K roller-delayed select-fire assault rifles. The composite shoulder stock of the MSG90 is adjustable for height (cheek), length of pull (shoulder), and is smaller and lighter than that of the PSG1. MSG90s have a slightly shorter contoured barrel to help with harmonic stabilization and consistent whip instead of the PSG1's heavy barrel, but remain free-floating.

The sighting system uses the multipurpose Weaver rail mount rather than the Picatinny rail for affixing sighting systems which can be purchased separately. This same scope mounting system is used on the HK21E, HK23E, and G41 (discontinued) series.

The barrel is weighted at the muzzle to aid stabilization of barrel whip to enhance accuracy. The addition of a flash suppressor adds to the overall length.

=== MSG90A1 ===
The MSG90A1 features a threaded barrel that comes with a bird cage type flash hider. The threaded barrel also allows for the use of a suppressor and more modern barrel attachments.

== Users ==
Country	Organization	Model	Quantity	Date	Reference
Albania	Special forces	_	_	_	
Bulgaria	Special forces	MSG90A1	_	_	
Finland	Karhu Team (Special Operations Unit of the Helsinki police department)	PSG1	_	_	
France	1st Marine Infantry Parachute Regiment of the French Army	MSG90	_	_	
India	National Security Guard, MARCOS, Indian Army, OCTOPUS, Greyhounds	_	_	_	
Indonesia	Komando Pasukan Katak (Kopaska) tactical diver group of the Indonesian Navy	MSG90	_	_	
Indonesia	Komando Pasukan Khusus (Kopassus) special forces group of the Indonesian Army	MSG90	_	_	
Iraq	Iraqi Armed Forces	MSG90A1	_	_	
Ireland	Army Ranger Wing (Historical, no longer in service)	PSG1	_	_	
Japan	Special Assault Team	PSG1	_	_	
Lithuania	Lithuanian Armed Forces	MSG90A1	_	_	
Luxembourg	Unité Spéciale de la Police intervention unit of the Grand Ducal Police	PSG1	_	_	
Malaysia	11th Grup Gerak Khas (GGK) Special Operation Unit of the Malaysian Army	MSG90A1	_	_	
Malaysia	Pasukan Khas Laut (PASKAL) Special Operation Unit of the Royal Malaysian Navy	MSG90A1	_	_	
Malaysia	Pasukan Khas Udara (PASKAU) Special Operation Unit of the Royal Malaysian Air Force	PSG1A1	_	_	
Malaysia	Pasukan Gerakan Khas Tactical Counter-Terrorism Unit of the Royal Malaysia Police	PSG1A1	_	_	
Mexico	Standard marksman rifle of the Mexican Army; Also used by the Policía Federal	MSG90SDN	_	_	
Montenegro	Armed Forces of Montenegro	PSG1A1, PSG1, MSG90A1, MSG90	_	_	
Montenegro	Protivteroristička Jedinica Policije (Counter-Terrorist Police Unit) (PTJ)	PSG1A1, PSG1, MSG90A1, MSG90	_	_	
Montenegro	Posebna Jedinica Policije (Special Police Unit) (PJP)	PSG1A1, PSG1, MSG90A1, MSG90	_	_	
Nepal	Nepalese Army	MSG90	100	_	
Netherlands	Police snipers of the Dienst Speciale Interventies (Special Intervention Service, DSI) of the National Unit Investigation & Interventions of the Dutch National Police	PSG1	_	_	
Norway	Hærens Jegerkommando (HJK), Army Special Forces Command and Marinejegerkommandoen (MJK), Navy Special Forces Command.	MSG90	_	_	
Pakistan	Used by the Pakistan Army. Produced under license by Pakistan Ordnance Factories	PSR-90	_	_	
Philippines	Philippine Army Special Operations Command Presidential Security Group Philippine National Police Special Action Force	MSG90; PSG1	_	_	
South Africa	South African Special Forces Brigade	PSG1	_	_	
South Korea	Republic of Korea Naval Special Warfare Brigade	MSG90; PSG1	_	_	
Spain	Grupo Especial de Operaciones of the Spanish police Grup Especial d'Intervenció (GEI) of the Mossos d'Esquadra.	_	_	_	
Taiwan	Republic of China Army	_	_	_	
Turkey	Turkish Special Forces	MSG90	_	_	
Ukraine		PSG1	_	_	
United Kingdom	Used as a precision (sniper) rifle by specialist firearms officers in the British police	PSG1	_	_	
United States	Hostage Rescue Team of the Federal Bureau of Investigation	MSG90	_	_	
United States	Delta Force – 1st Special Forces Operational Detachment-Delta (1st SFOD-D)	MSG90	_	_	
Vietnam	Mobile Police Force (Canh Sat Co Dong)	PSR-90	_	_	

== See also ==
- Walther WA 2000, contemporary and direct competitor
- Dragunov SVD
- PSR-90
- Azb DMR MK1
