= National Aerospace Science & Technology Park =

Pakistani Aerospace Industrial Cluster

Coordinates: 33°36′26″N 73°06′01″E

- Abbreviation: NASTP
- Formation: 4 August 2023
- Founder: Pakistan Air Force
- Founded at: PAF Base Nur Khan, Rawalpindi, Pakistan
- Type: Aerospace and Cyberspace
- Headquarters: Kamra, Punjab
- Location(s): Rawalpindi, Punjab; Lahore, Punjab; Kharian, Punjab; Karachi, Sindh
- Region served: Pakistan
- Deputy President: Air-Mshl. Kashif Qamar
- Key people: Shehbaz Sharif (Founder); Chief of the Air Staff (As its president)
- Website: nastp.gov.pk

The National Aerospace Science & Technology Park (NASTP) is a Pakistani aerospace and cyberspace technology park established by the Pakistan Air Force. Its primary objective is to enhance Pakistan's capabilities in the aerospace industry by establishing aerospace-based supercomputer clusters and innovation hubs throughout the country. NASTP aims to create an ecosystem that fosters design, research, development, and innovation, including the aviation, space, IT, and cyber sectors.

== History ==
Prime Minister Shehbaz Sharif inaugurated the Park at the Pakistan Air Force's Base Nur Khan in Rawalpindi on 4 August 2023. At the inaugural event, Field Marshal Asim Munir, the Chief of Army Staff (COAS), described NASTP as "a project of national and strategic significance" that would "spur technological progress and foster self-reliance".

Turkish Aerospace Industries (TAI) established its inaugural office within the park. TAI was the first Turkish defense company to set up an office in Pakistan's inaugural technopark. Another Turkish defense company, Baykar, also opened an office in NASTP.

NASTP has developed various weapons and defense systems, such as the KaGeM V3 cruise missile, the SR-3D Radar, and the YIHA-III kamikaze drone, often in collaboration with Turkish defense companies.

The president of Kyrgyzstan, Sadyr Zhaparov, visited NASTP in December 2025 as part of his official state visit to Pakistan.

== Headquarters ==
NASTP has established regional headquarters in key areas across Pakistan, including Rawalpindi for the Federal region, Lahore for the Punjab province, and Karachi for the South region. Additionally, the flagship Aerospace Cluster of Pakistan is situated in Kamra/Attock.

== See also ==
- KaGeM V3
- SR-3D Radar
- YIHA-III
- Link-17
