= SR-3D Radar =

Pakistani Radar

SR-3D
- Country of origin: Pakistan
- Manufacturer: NASTP
- Designer: Sensors Division
- Introduced: March 2024
- Type: Early-warning radar / Target acquisition radar
- Frequency: S band
- RPM: 30
- Range: 80 km (50 mi)
- Other names: Search Radar-3 Dimension

The SR-3D is an S-band active electronically scanned array (AESA) 3-dimensional Early-warning radar developed by NASTP.

== Design ==
The SR-3D is a dual-purpose sensor which can be used as a surveillance radar for early warning or even as a target acquisition system for Ground Based Air Defense Systems (GBADS) meaning it can support Surface to air missiles (SAMs), Close-in Weapon Systems (CIWS) and Anti-aircraft guns. According to NASTP, the radar uses advanced digital beamforming technology which enables it to accurately detect and track enemy targets including ones with low Radar cross section while also being resistant to Electronic Counter Measures (ECM). Reportedly, the SR-3D will serve as the basis of a longer-ranged and more capable radar variant which is currently under development. The new variant will have double the range of the SR-3D and is expected to be revealed by late 2026.

== Development ==
Since the mid-2010s, Pakistan had started efforts to involve its local defense industry in radar/sensor production. The program pioneered with the local MPDR upgrade program in 2019 when the PAF upgraded Siemens MPDR-45/90 low level radars originally acquired in the 1980s. Through experience gained in the upgrade program, the PAF initiated R&D work on new original radar designs. Around 2020, several defense contractors including Air Weapons Complex (AWC) under the National Engineering and Scientific Commission (NESCOM) had prototyped gallium nitride (GaN) based modules. The PAF later set up NASTP which took over all R&D projects from PAF. It revealed the SR-3D during IDEAS-2024 at Karachi.

== See also ==
- AM-350S
