= AM-350S =

Pakistani active electronically scanned array radar

- Country of origin: Pakistan
- Designer: NRTC; Blue Surge
- Introduced: November 2024
- Type: Early-warning radar
- Frequency: S band
- RPM: 6rpm (10 seconds refresh rate)
- Range: 350 km (220 mi)
- Altitude: 60,000 ft (18,000 m)
- Azimuth: 360 degrees
- Elevation: -6 degrees 20 degrees
- Power: >400 Watts

The AM-350S is a Pakistani S-band active electronically scanned array (AESA) 3-dimensional air search radar developed jointly by NRTC and Blue Surge.

== Overview ==
The AM-350S was revealed to the public during the 2024 IDEAS expo in Karachi based on the Hino 500 truck. It is a gallium nitride (GaN)-based active electronically scanned array (AESA) radar with digital beamforming capabilities with a surveillance range of 350km and has a 360° FOV and flexible elevation features, enabling it to monitor altitudes of up to 60,000 feet.

It has resilient anti-jamming capabilities with frequency hopping, vector control, and side-lobe suppression. Being an AESA-based system, the AM-350S can leverage its multiple TRMs to emit in different or unique frequencies in one pulse, making it more difficult for an enemy ECM systems to single out a particular frequency for jamming.

In 2026, it was reported that the AM-350S along with the Machaan radars were interlinked with Chinese satellite data links enhancing their operational capabilities.

== See also ==
- AN/FPS-117
- Ground Master 400
- SR-3D Radar
