= KaGeM V3 =

- Type: Smart ALCM
- Place of origin: Pakistan; Turkey

Production history
- Designer: Baykar; NASTP
- Designed: 2023
- Manufacturer: NASTP
- Developed from: KEMANKEŞ 2

Specifications
- Mass: ~ 70 kg (150 lb)
- Length: 2.47 m (8 ft 1 in)
- Height: ~ 0.49 m (19 in)
- Warhead: HE
- Warhead weight: 20 kilograms (44 lb)
- Engine: Turbojet
- Operational range: 150 km (93 mi; 81 nmi)
- Flight altitude: 1,830 m (6,004 ft)
- Guidance system: AI based guidance
- Launch platform: UCAVs

The KaGeM V3 is a next generation smart air-launched cruise missile (ALCM) developed jointly by Baykar Technologies and NASTP for the Pakistan Air Force. It is currently undergoing development phase and its existence was revealed to the public in 2023.

== Overview ==
Since 2019, the PAF has been revamping its drone fleet with procurements of both locally made (such as the Shapar & Burraq) and Turkish made (such as the Akıncı & TB2) UCAVs. The KaGeM-V3 in this case is an attempt to develop a local smart munition for use by PAF UCAVs.

KaGeM V3 is reportedly a further development of the KEMANKEŞ 2 smart munition which is developed by Baykar. While little is known about the smart munition with no official details from Baykar and NASTP, it will reportedly feature an airbreathing Turbojet engine and a single-piece horizontal wing which makes it heavier than its predecessor. Furthermore, it will also feature AI-based autopilot and guidance system which will enhance its flight capabilities. The KaGeM's has a 20 kg warhead capacity which can be equipped with conventional style shaped, fragmentation and HE warheads.

== Operators ==
- Pakistan
  - Pakistan Air Force

== See also ==
- Brimstone (missile)
