= Air Defence Command (Pakistan) =

- فضائ دفاع کمانڈ
- Active: 1 June 1961 - present
- Country: Pakistan
- Allegiance: Pakistan Armed Forces
- Branch: Pakistan Air Force
- Type: Command
- Role: Airspace monitoring Anti-aircraft warfare GCI
- Headquarters: Chaklala, Rawalpindi
- Nickname: ADC
- Anniversaries: 6 September (Defence Day)
- Predecessor: No. 1 Group
- Engagements: 1965 Indo-Pakistani war; 1971 Indo-Pakistani war; Soviet Afghan war; Operation Bedaar; Operation Sentinel; 2016 India-Pakistan skirmishes; 2019 India Pakistan skirmishes; Operation Swift Retort; 2025 India-Pakistan standoff; Operation Bunyanun Marsoos

Commanders
- Notable commanders: Inamul Haque Khan 1st AOC ADC

The Air Defence Command (ADC) (Urdu: فضائ دفاع کمانڈ), is a major command of the Pakistan Air Force (PAF) which is responsible for the surface front of Pakistan's air defence, complementing the air defence provided by PAF fighter squadrons.

== History ==
=== Pre-formation ===
ADC's history traces back to 1949 with the establishment of the first PAF Air defence elements. Four Mobile Observer Units (MOUs) were raised at Mauripur airbase in Karachi which were similar to the USA's Ground Observer Corps, these were initially commanded by Squadron Leader Lister and other British RAF Officers as the RPAF was short on manpower. The personnel of these MOUs equipped with wireless sets and binoculars would report all visual air activity in their area of operations to a control and reporting (C&R) center. Owing to the success of these units, the Air Headquarters expanded the MOU force throughout the 1950s and by 1959, 7 MOU Wings had been operationalized. During this time, Squadron Leader SM Haq who was a grounded pilot became the first Pakistani officer to be appointed as an Air defence System Specialist for the RPAF. Haq is considered to be the father of modern-day PAF Air defence and was sent to the UK along with Flight Lieutenant MAU Chaudhary (another AD officer) in order to study the Royal Air Force's Air defence establishment. Radars were still a problem as the RPAF had not inherited any sensor equipment from the RIAF. Initial attempts were made by RPAF's then chief; AVM Richard Atcherley who approached the Americans and British but to no avail since radars were still sensitive technology at that time. In 1950, Prime Minister Liaquat Ali Khan visited London for the Commonwealth Prime Ministers' Conference whom AVM Atcherly accompanied. Upon being inquired for any points to be taken up with the British government, Atcherley briefed PM Liaqat about the urgency of surveillance sensors and radars for the RPAF Air defence. Since the majority of RPAF air activity was centered at Karachi at the time and the port of Karachi was considered to be a valuable asset by the British commanders of the RPAF, early air defence establishment was consequently set up at the then capital city. The first Sector Operations Centre (SOC); No. 901 Signals Unit was raised at RPAF Base Korangi Creek in 1952 which processed all data and information received from Control-Reporting Centers and MOUs regarding aerial activity in the surrounding region. The battle staff of the 901 Signals unit would plot the air picture by hand through wooden and metallic instruments and would then conduct aerial defence planning.

=== Post-formation ===
The Air defence Command was formed on 1 June 1961 as the Air defence Headquarters (ADHQ) at PAF Base Peshawar after its predecessor the No. 1 Group which managed the small surveillance force of the PAF was disbanded owing to the expanding strength of the PAF's Air defence network. While ADHQ held operational control over the PAF's Air defence formations, the Operations branch at Air Headquarters (AHQ) handled planning and policy functions.

In the aftermath of the 1965 Indo-Pakistani War, a major re-organization the PAF was done which led to the establishment of the Operations Command and a brief disbandment of ADHQ. Operations Command took over some policy making and operational control roles of all field units including the air defence sub-branch from AHQ. However a number of administrative and organizational problems were created mainly due to duplication of control which led to the Operations Command being divided in 1970. The ADHQ was revived and continued practicing operational control over AD units.

The PAF's top brass reviewed the air force's Air defence organization multiple times in the next few years and in 1974, the ADHQ was re-established as the Air defence Command (ADC) with it taking control of day-to-day operational control of field units under the leadership of its first AOC; AVM Inam H Khan who took charge on 23 March 1975. Under the new setup which was approved on 25 July 1975, the Senior Air Staff Officer (SASO) and Senior Engineering Staff Officer (SESO) who overlook the two main pillars of Air defence activity (Operations and maintenance) were established within the ADC chain of command.

=== Operational history ===
ADC units remained actively involved during the Soviet-Afghan war with its WESSEC and NORSEC providing surveillance and Ground-controlled interception to PAF combat squadrons against communist warplanes which often intruded into Pakistani airspace.

During the Chagai-I and Chagai-II nuclear tests, multiple SAM units of the command were deployed for Point-defence missions as part of Operation Bedaar.

As part of Operation Sentinel, the command deployed its assets to their wartime locations amidst raising concerns of an Indian invasion. Similar deployments were also seen in the 2016 skirmishes with India and Operation Swift Retort in 2019.

== Components ==
=== Sectors ===
- NORSEC
- WESSEC
- CENSEC
- SOUSEC

== See also ==
- Central Air Command (Pakistan)
- Army Air Defence Command
- Aerospace defence Command
