= 23 mm caliber =

23 mm caliber is a specific size of popular autocannon ammunition.

This ammunition size has been widely used in many conflicts worldwide. Examples of armaments using it are:

- 23×115mm caliber, used on many Soviet and Russian airplanes
- 23×122mm
- 23×139mmSR
- 23×152mmB caliber, used on Ilyushin Il-2 attack plane as well as on later Soviet anti-aircraft guns
- 23×260mm caliber, telescoped ammunition used on the Rikhter R-23 autocannon

== Cartridges ==
(incomplete list)

Dimensions	Name	Date	Bullet diameter	Case length	Rim	Base	Shoulder	Neck	Cartridge length
23×152mmB									
24.1×70mm	.950 JDJ		24.13mm (.950 in)	70mm (2.75 in)	29mm (1.14in)	29mm (1.14 in)	29mm (1.14 in)	26mm (1.023 in)	101.6 mm (4.00 in)

== See also ==
- 12.7×99mm
- 12.7×108mm
- 14.5x114
- 20 mm caliber
- 25×137mm
- 40 mm grenade
- Bofors 40 mm gun
- List of cartridges (weaponry), pistol and rifle
