= Yalguzag sniper rifle =

Yalguzag
- Type: Sniper rifle
- Place of origin: Azerbaijan

Service history
- In service: 2018

Production history
- Designer: Ministry of Defence Industry of Azerbaijan
- Designed: 2011-2012
- Manufacturer: Ministry of Defence Industry of Azerbaijan
- Produced: 2018-present

Specifications
- Mass: 7.1kg
- Length: 1080 mm
- Cartridge: 7.62×51mm NATO
- Action: bolt-action
- Muzzle velocity: 860 m/s
- Effective firing range: 1000 m
- Feed system: 10-round magazine
- Sights: Day or night optics

Yalguzag sniper rifle is a bolt-action sniper rifle that fires the 7.62×51mm NATO round used by the Azerbaijani Land Forces.

== Users ==
- Azerbaijan

== See also ==
- Istiglal anti-materiel rifle
- JNG-90
- Accuracy International Arctic Warfare
- Sako TRG
