= National Radio & Telecommunication Corporation =

Pakistani defense state-owned enterprise

- Trade name: NRTC
- Type: State-owned enterprise
- Industry: Defense/Electronics
- Founded: 1966; 60 years ago in Haripur, Khyber-Pakhtunkhwa, Pakistan
- Headquarters: Haripur, Pakistan
- Area served: Worldwide
- Key people: CEO: Azmat Shabbir
- Owner: Ministry of Defence Production
- Website: www.nrtc.com.pk

The National Radio & Telecommunication Corporation (NRTC) is a major defence state-owned enterprise based in Haripur, Khyber-Pakhtunkhwa, Pakistan. It's a provider of electronics and technical services in both the public and private sectors.

NRTC is owned by the Ministry of Defence Production. The organization has been instrumental in developing advance Military Communication, Jamming, Anti Drone System, EW, EOD, Radars, Safe and Smart City Solutions for the Pakistan Armed Forces and law enforcement agencies, both federal and provincial along with export to friendly countries.

== History ==
NRTC was established in February 1966 as an organization of the Ministry of Defense Production (MoDP).

In January 2020, the former Chief of the Army Staff, General Qamar Javed Bajwa, inaugurated the Electronic Warfare (EW) and Ground Surveillance Radar (GSR) testing laboratories at the NRTC's Haripur location. These laboratories are equipped with EW equipment and GSR radars that have been developed indigenously. In July 2020, Prime Minister Imran Khan inaugurated NRTC's production facility that manufactures Pakistan's first-ever indigenously-developed ventilators. NRTC also developed drones that will be used for spraying pesticides and insecticides in fields in the country. The announcement came as locusts had invaded agricultural fields across the country, threatening crop yields.

In 2021, the Telephone Industries of Pakistan (TIP) was transferred to NRTC in an effort to revitalize the organization. The NRTC agreed to assume TIP's liabilities, which accumulated to $RS 8 billion since 2004.

In September 2023, NRTC signed an MOU with Microsoft to provide service to Pakistani customers as per the Telecom Policy 2015 under Public Private Partnership (PPP).

In 2026, NRTC signed a deal with Turkey's Pasifik Teknoloji to license produce more than a 100,000 Merküt FPV loitering munition drones for the Pakistan Army.

== Notable products ==
- Military radios
- Electronics & electro-optics
- EOD & robotics
- C4ISR & navigation system
- Electronic warfare system
- Anti-drone system
- Security & surveillance Solutions
- Border security solutions
- Jamming solutions
- A.I. & Cybersecurities
- Communication solutions
- Scanning solutions
- Traffic management system
- Solar & power solutions
- Smart safe cities solutions

== See also ==
- AM-350S
