= Tabuk Sniper Rifle =

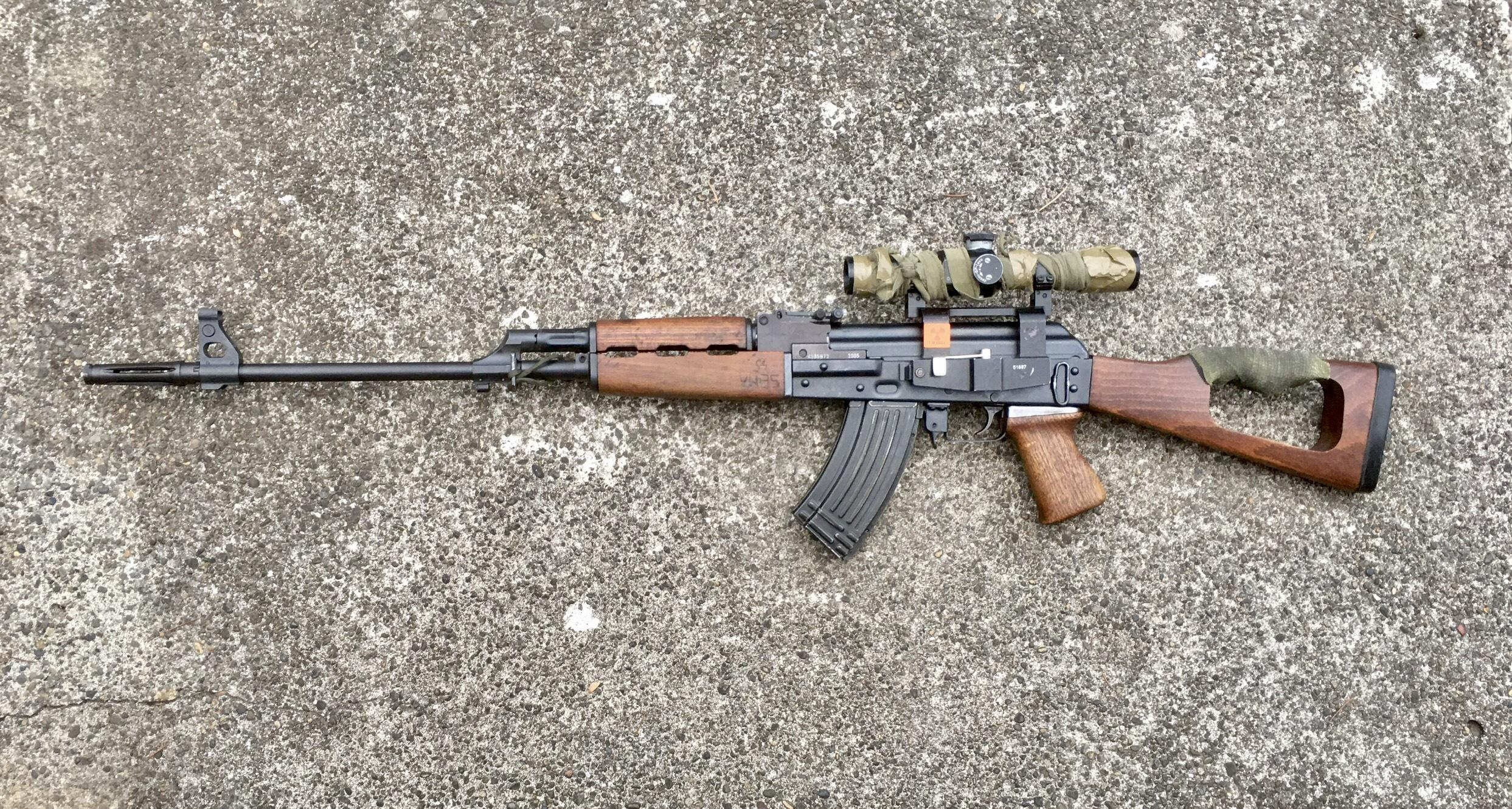
- Type: Designated marksman rifle
- Place of origin: Iraq

Service history
- In service: 1978–present
- Used by: See Users
- Wars: Iran–Iraq War; Lebanese Civil War; Gulf War; Iraq War; War In Iraq

Production history
- Designer: Zastava Arms
- Designed: 1970s
- Manufacturer: Al-Qadissiya Establishments
- Produced: 1978–present

Specifications
- Mass: 4.5 kg (9.9 lb)
- Length: 1,110 mm (44 in)
- Barrel length: 600 mm (24 in)
- Cartridge: 7.62×39mm
- Action: Gas operated
- Muzzle velocity: 740 m/s (2,400 ft/s)
- Effective firing range: 300–600 m (330–660 yd)
- Feed system: 30 round box magazine
- Sights: Telescopic sight and Iron sight

The Tabuk Sniper Rifle is an Iraqi semi-automatic designated marksman rifle, made from a modified version of the Zastava M76 sniper rifle. The Tabuk Rifle was manufactured at the Al-Qadissiya Establishments in Iraq using machinery sold to Iraq by Zastava Arms of Yugoslavia when Saddam Hussein was president.

== Background ==
Zastava Arms of Yugoslavia originally developed this rifle from its experience in making its M70 rifles (a variant of the AKM with some minor differences from the original), particularly the M76. All of the rifles in the M70 series share what is traditionally considered an RPK style receiver, that is the receiver is made with a thicker gauge of sheet metal formed over a larger and heavier trunnion. While this does add to weight, it has a positive effect on durability which is why the modification came about. The Yugoslavian version of the RPK, the Zastava M72, is a longer barreled member of the M70 family and is the weapon upon which the Tabuk is based.

The barrel length of the Iraqi Tabuk rifle is 23.6 inches – slightly longer and thinner than a Yugoslavian M72 barrel, but much longer than a traditional AKM or the M70 (16.25 inches). The Tabuk, like the M72, has a provision for muzzle attachments in the typical Russian thread pattern of 14×1mm left hand thread, which means that it can accept several variations of Soviet flash hiders and muzzle brakes, as well as Soviet-designed sound suppression devices.

== Design details ==
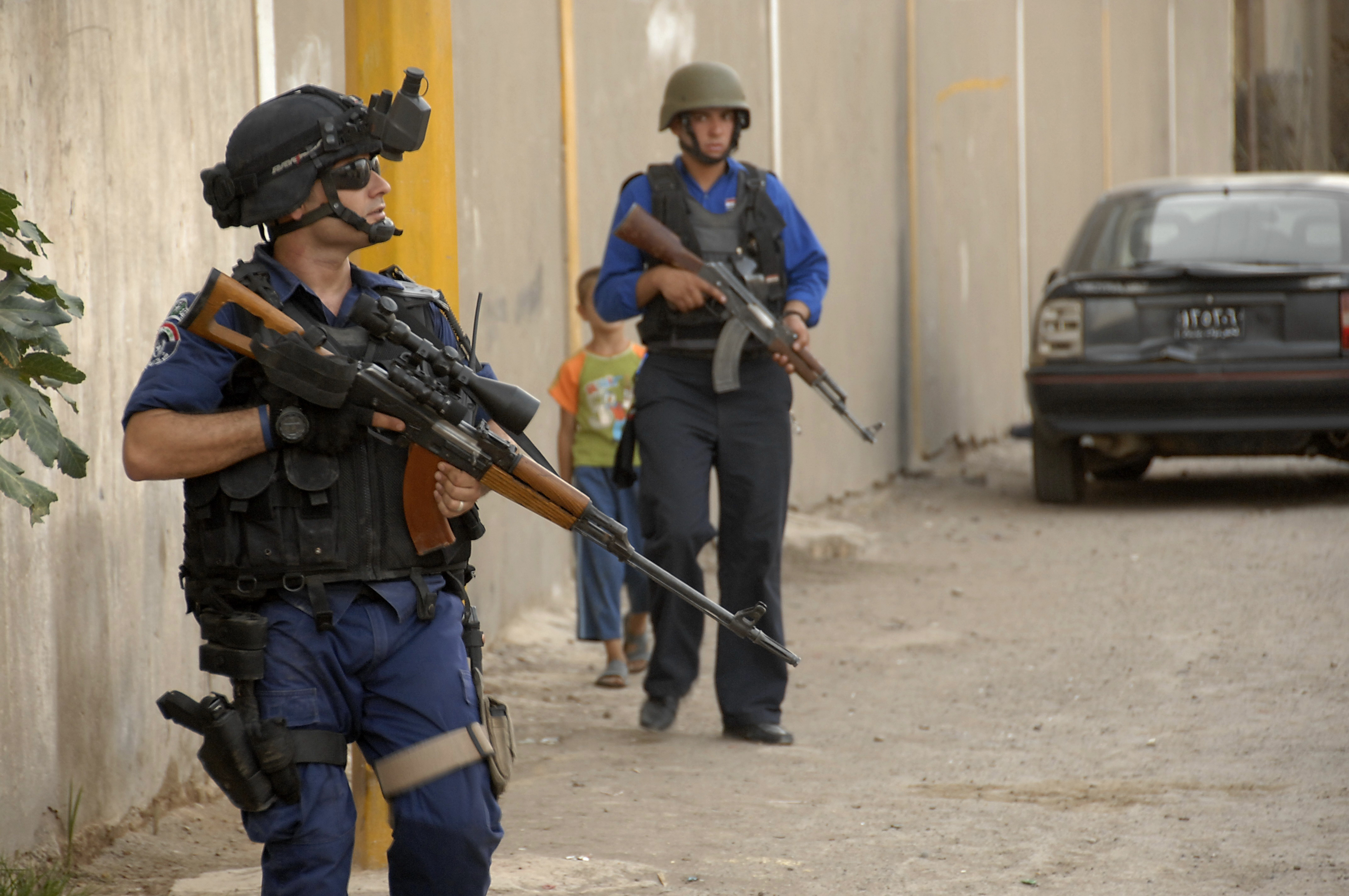
Iraqi police officer armed with a Tabuk sniper rifle in the Ha'Teen district, Baghdad.

The differences between the Tabuk and the Yugoslavian M72 are few; the semi-auto-only mechanism of the Tabuk is not a visually obvious difference, but is perhaps the most important. This feature dictates the rifle's role as one of precision fire and not suppressive fire. It is also important as it prevents poorly trained individuals from subjecting the barrel of a rifle intended for precision to full-auto fire, which would shorten that rifle's useful life.

A more visible difference is the much lighter barrel fitted to the Tabuk. The M72's barrel is finned at the rear near the hand guards and is far heavier than that of the Tabuk (or that of a standard AKM). The thickness of the M72's barrel exists to facilitate heat distribution via mass and cooling via surface area. Since the option to fire full-auto has been omitted, (and it is not typical of eastern bloc long range precision rifles to use heavy barrels for accuracy), the Tabuk, like the SVD and the PSL, has a relatively light barrel.

The Tabuk differs from the M72 in some other ways. It has provision for mounting optics, though this is not an unusual accessory on Eastern Bloc weapons, and it has a skeletonized buttstock with a cheek piece. A third difference, and perhaps the most important (though not definitive) visual cue when identifying the Tabuk, is the conspicuous lack of a bipod. The M72's bipod, which is not detachable from the M72 (though sometimes removed by undisciplined troops), is quite obvious from afar when attached. It was likely removed from the Tabuk design to enhance mechanical accuracy and reduce weight, though appropriately designed precision bipods can add useful stability (practical accuracy) for long range shooting.

Since it is essentially an accurized and scoped M72, the Tabuk is chambered for 7.62×39mm.

Because the Tabuk is chambered for the Soviet M43 or 7.62×39mm cartridge, it cannot technically function as a sniper rifle (by western standards). With a maximum effective range of only 600 meters (based on ammunition trajectory), the Tabuk should instead be considered a designated marksman's rifle.

The Tabuk is, within its given range, similarly effective as the Dragunov or PSL. At the far end of its effective range, however, it is decidedly less lethal than its higher velocity counterparts due to the round's combination of stability and low velocity, giving it less reach than the 7.62×54mmR caliber SVD. It visually resembles an RPK, which may make identifying enemy snipers more difficult. Likewise, its acoustic signature is similar to an AKM.

== Users ==
- Iraq: Main producer and user since 1978.

== See also ==
- Zastava M76
- Azb sniper rifle
- Mk 12 Special Purpose Rifle
- Marine Scout Sniper Rifle
- CAR 817 DMR
