= Istiglal anti-materiel rifle =

Istiglal Ist-14.5
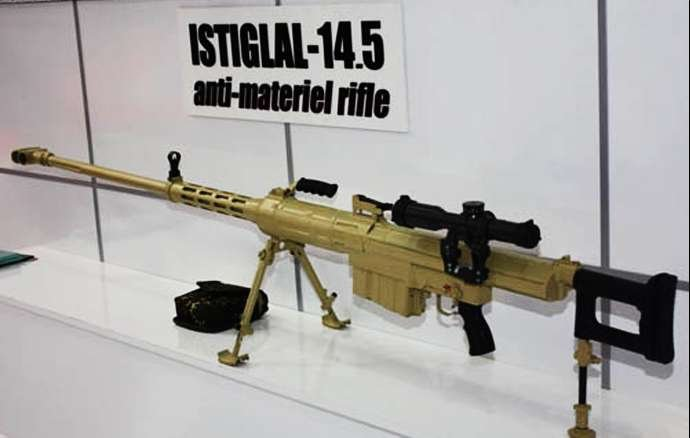
- Type: Anti-materiel rifle
- Place of origin: Azerbaijan

Service history
- In service: 2008–present
- Used by: See Users

Production history
- Designer: RPE Automatic Lines
- Designed: 2008
- Manufacturer: Telemexanika zavodu, parent organization Ministry of Defence Industry of Azerbaijan
- Produced: 2008–present
- Variants: See Variants

Specifications
- Mass: 33.8 kg (74 lbs); 28 kg (61.6 lbs) (new version)
- Length: 2256 mm (89")
- Barrel length: 1300 mm (51")
- Cartridge: 14.5×114mm, 12.7×108mm
- Action: Recoil-operated, rotating bolt
- Muzzle velocity: 1,132 m/s (3,714 ft/s)
- Effective firing range: (14.5×114mm); 3,000 m (9,843 ft) - 4,000 m (13,123 ft) +
- Feed system: 5-round detachable box magazine

The İstiglal IST-14.5 anti-materiel rifle (also known as the Istiglal and means independence in Turkish and Azerbaijan Language) is a recoil-operated, semi-automatic anti-materiel sniper rifle produced by Telemexanika zavodu (Factory of Telemechanics), subsidiary of the Ministry of Defence Industry of Azerbaijan.

The Istiglal is chambered for the 14.5×114mm round.

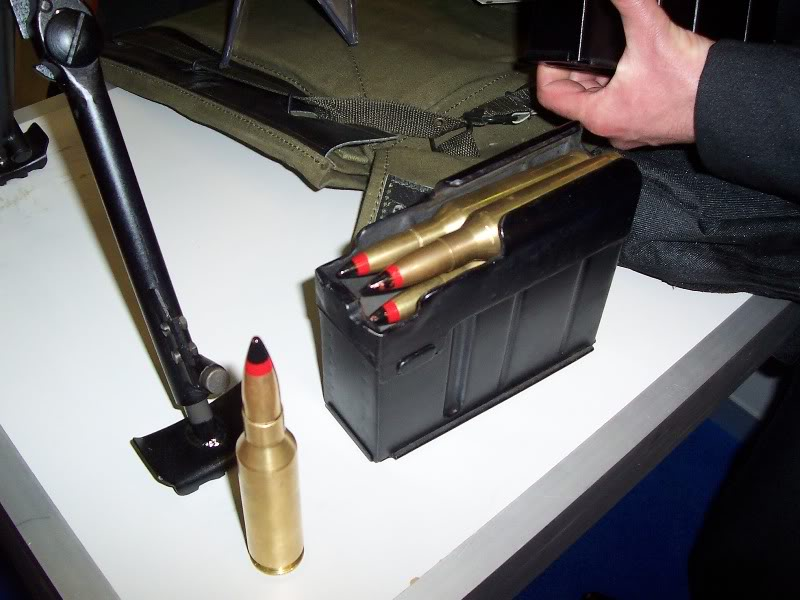
14.5×114mm ammunition in the Istiglal's 5-round detachable box magazine

== History ==
Although developed in 2008, it was only revealed in 2009 during the International Defense Exhibition Fair. Its appearance has attracted a huge number of visitors.

It has been exported to the Turkish Armed Forces and the Pakistan Armed Forces.

== Design ==
The Istiglal can be taken down into 2 separate components for easy transportation. The rifle is said to be operable in adverse weather, such as rain and dirt with temperature ranges from −50 to 50 °C (−58 to 122 °F).

== Variants ==
=== Mübariz (Fighter) ===
This weapon is named after Mubariz Ibrahimov, the National Hero of Azerbaijan. It is a 12.7×108mm version of the Istiglal 14.5mm anti-materiel sniper rifle introduced by the Ministry of Defense Industry of Azerbaijan. The 12.7mm Mubariz sniper rifle is much lighter in comparison to the Istiglal at 15 kg (33 pounds) with a five-round magazine.

== Users ==
- Azerbaijan: In use by the Azerbaijani Armed Forces.
- Pakistan: Used by the Pakistan Army; more planned to be procured.
- Turkey: The Turkish Armed Forces is interested in importing the rifle and is having talks with the Azerbaijani Armed Forces. An unknown number of Istiglals were purchased. In April 2011, Mechanical and Chemical Industry Corporation announced that sniper rifle, which will be produced jointly, will differ much from the model that is being tested in Azerbaijan. Changes will be made in the design, weight and some systems of the weapon. The production of IST-12.7 sniper rifle in Turkey is the first military production transfer of Azerbaijan.

== See also ==
- Yalguzag sniper rifle
- Snipex T-Rex
- Snipex Alligator
