= Siyavash sniper rifle =

Siyavash Sniper Rifle
- Type: Sniper rifle
- Place of origin: Islamic Republic of Iran

Service history
- In service: 2013–present
- Used by: Islamic Republic of Iran Army

Specifications
- Mass: 6.5 kg (14 lbs)
- Cartridge: 7.62×51mm NATO
- Action: Bolt action
- Feed system: 5-round

The Siyavash sniper rifle is a light rifle designed for and deployed by the Iranian Army. It is a clone of the US M40 rifle.

== Design ==
The Siyavash has a five-round magazine and weighs 14 pounds (6.5 kg).
