= Komodo Armament D7CH =

Indonesian sniper rifle

Komodo Armament Chassis Sniper Rifle
- Type: Sniper rifle
- Place of origin: Indonesia

Service history
- In service: 2018–present

Production history
- Designer: Komodo Armament
- Manufacturer: Komodo Armament
- Produced: 2016 (?)–present

Specifications
- Mass: 6 kg (with 5 round magazine); 6.5 kg (with 10 round magazine)
- Length: 1220 mm
- Barrel length: Heavy barrel: 26 in (660 mm); Tactical: 18.5 in (470 mm)
- Cartridge: 7.62×51mm NATO
- Caliber: 7.62mm
- Action: Bolt action
- Effective firing range: 1000 m
- Maximum firing range: 1200 m
- Feed system: 5 or 10 round magazine
- Sights: Optical sight

The Komodo Armament D7CH is a bolt-action sniper rifle produced by PT Komodo Armament Indonesia, chambered in 7.62x51 mm. The rifle is configurable to adapt and receive a wide array of accessories that are needed by the operator.

== Design ==
Like other Komodo Armament rifles, D7CH sniper rifle is manufactured using polymer material, with cerakote or hard anodize finish.

== Users ==
- Indonesia: 100 units ordered in 2018.

== See also ==
- Pindad SPR
- Remington MSR
