= T-12 sniper rifle =

Turkish bolt-action sniper rifle

T-12
- Type: Sniper rifle
- Place of origin: Turkey

Production history
- Manufacturer: MKE

Specifications
- Mass: 4.8 kg (without magazine)
- Length: 1080 mm
- Caliber: 5.56×45mm NATO
- Action: Bolt action
- Muzzle velocity: 915 m/s
- Effective firing range: 900 m
- Feed system: 30-round magazine

The T-12 sniper rifle is a bolt-action sniper rifle produced for the Turkish Armed Forces by Makina ve Kimya Endüstrisi Kurumu in an effort to replace foreign produced sniper rifles with domestic Turkish products. It uses the standard 5.56x45mm NATO round.
