= POF Eye =

- Type: Special-purpose hand-held weapon system
- Place of origin: Pakistan

Service history
- In service: 2008–present

Production history
- Designer: Pakistan Ordnance Factories
- Designed: 2008
- Manufacturer: Pakistan Ordnance Factories
- Produced: 2008–present
- Variants: 3 (including standard)

POF Eye is a special-purpose hand-held CornerShot weapon system. It was first revealed at the 5th International Defence Exhibition and Seminar (IDEAS 2008), held at the Karachi Expo Centre in November 2008. It is designed for SWAT and special forces teams in hostile situations, particularly counter-terrorism and hostage rescue operations.

== History ==
The system, specially designed for urban combat, anti-terrorist operations and police SWAT operations, was developed by Pakistan Ordnance Factories. Chairman of the POF board, Lt. Gen. Syed Sabahat Husain, told the visiting delegates at IDEAS 2008 that this new product of POF may meet the requirements of law enforcing agencies in order to curb the terrorist activities. The live demonstration of this gun was also shown to the delegates.

According to one of the designers, Ashfaq Ahmad, the overall designing and finalizing of this gun took 6 months. Several domestic and international participants and delegates took keen interest in the newly introduced anti-terrorist weapon. Once the weapon is put into mass production, POF would take orders for its supply to prospective local and international buyers. To help promote the weapon, POF has conducted training sessions to help law enforcement agencies in Pakistan familiarize themselves with the POF Eye.

As of 2014, the POF Eye has been sold to Pakistani security forces. In 2015, General Tan Sri Raja Mohamed Affandi, the then-Malaysian Army chief visited the POF to examine the POF Eye.

In 13 February 2018, the Eye was featured in a POF documentary.

== Variants ==
The POF Eye is available in several variations. It can be mounted with

1. standard 9 mm semi-automatic pistol
2. sub-machine gun
3. grenade launcher

== Design ==
This project was designed and supervised by Dr. Muhammad Ayaz Khan – chief member of the board of directors of POF. In 2008. he gave a briefing to the press regarding its features. Unlike the Cornershot which is chiefly made of plastic, the POF Eye is constructed entirely of metal. The lower receiver is based on its MP5 clones and the stock similar to the Galil.

It includes a small high-resolution camera, laser sight and a colour LCD monitor, which can observe and view a target from various vantage points. The video camera enables forces to scan an area prior to pinpointing a target and broadcast the footage directly, in real time, to the operating team behind, or to a Command Post monitor. Its head can turn 75 degrees.

The Eye has been designed as of 2016 to allow the use on an image transmission package with an IR camera that has a range of 20 meters. Video transmission has a range of 400 meters. An LCD screen mounted on the back of a person with an ocular device strapped on the person’s helmet.

The package also includes a battery pack worn on a vest or similar gear that can be easily changed in the field.
