= MKE JNG-90 =

Turkish sniper rifle

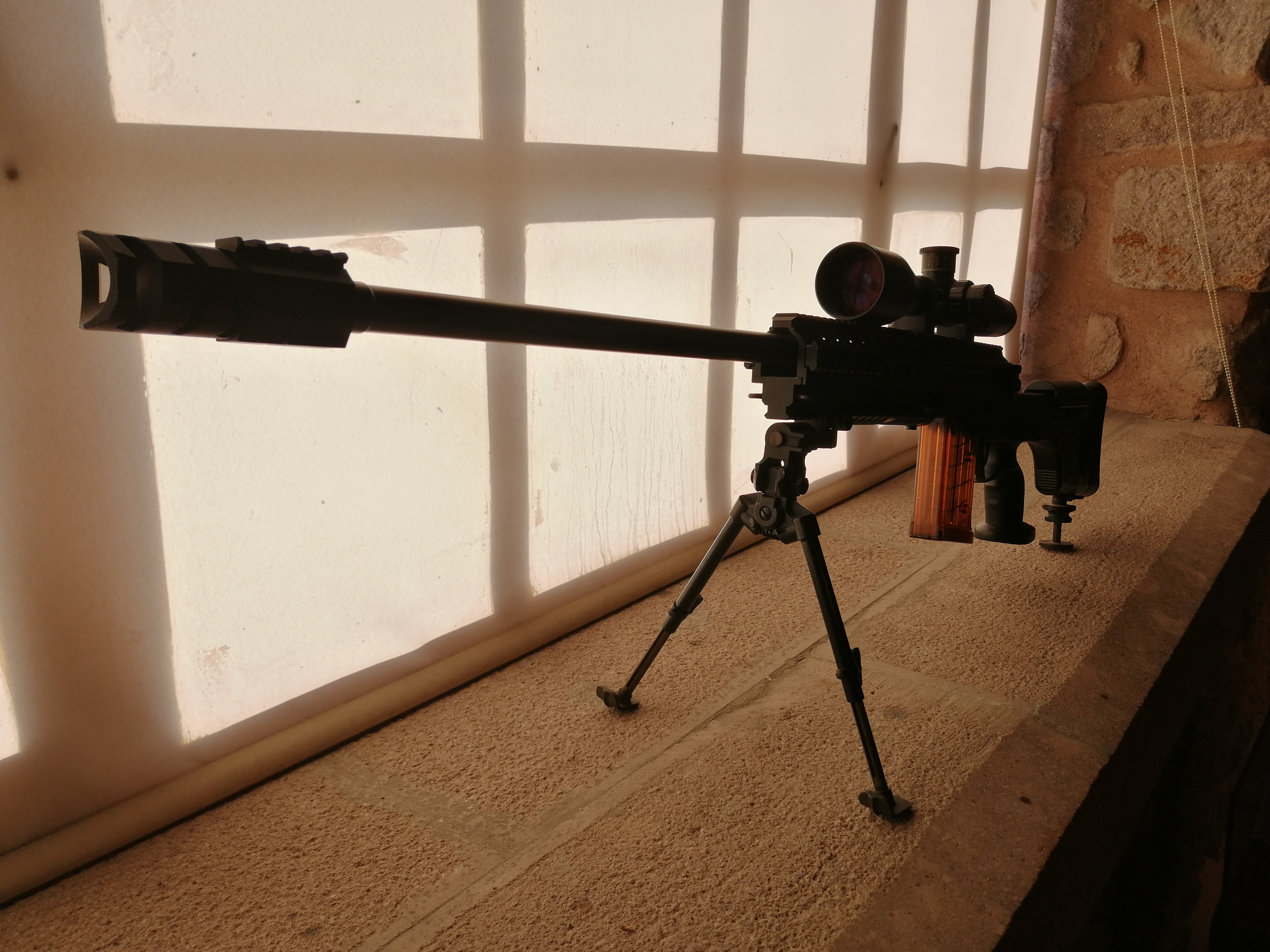
- Type: Sniper rifle
- Place of origin: Turkey

Service history
- In service: 2008–present
- Used by: See Users
- Wars: Kurdish–Turkish conflict (1978–present); Syrian Civil War

Production history
- Designer: Mechanical and Chemical Industry Corporation
- Designed: 2004–2008
- Manufacturer: Mechanical and Chemical Industry Corporation
- Produced: 2008–Present (as JMK BORA-12)

Specifications
- Mass: 6.4 kg (14 lb)
- Length: Retracted: 1,220 mm (48 in); Extended: 1,265 mm (49.8 in)
- Barrel length: 660 mm (26 in)
- Cartridge: 7.62×51mm NATO
- Action: bolt-action
- Muzzle velocity: 860 m/s
- Effective firing range: 1000 m
- Feed system: 10-round magazine
- Sights: day or night optics

MKE JNG-90 is a bolt-action sniper rifle that fires the 7.62×51mm NATO round used by the Turkish military. Development of the weapon first started back in 2004 to 2008. Its nickname is Bora and it is currently being offered for export.

== Design ==
The JNG-90 was designed with the collaboration of Turkish Gendarmerie and Mechanical and Chemical Industry Corporation (MKE). Designed by Capt. (Rtd.) Mustafa Dolar and Sgt. Mjr. Necmi Güngör, rifle is accurate in terms of shooting 0.3 MOA groups at up to 100 meters range according to MKE tests. Picatinny rails are provided on the forend and on the upper receiver. The rifle also has an adjustable buttstock.

== Users ==
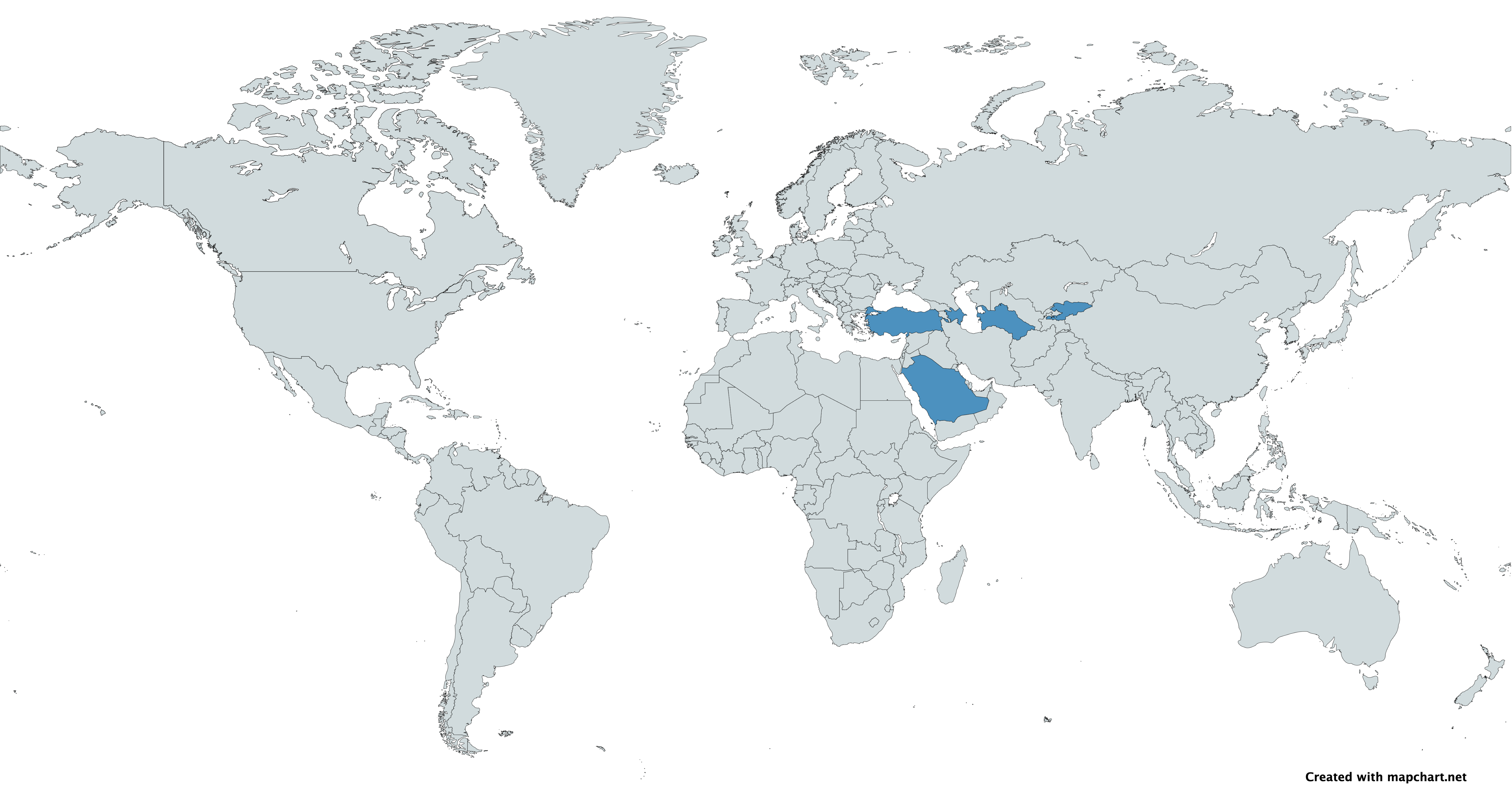
Map with MKE JNG-90 users in blue

- Azerbaijan: Purchased unknown number of JNG-90s.
- Kyrgyzstan: Purchased unknown number of JNG-90s
- Turkey: In use by the Turkish Armed Forces.
- Turkmenistan: Purchased unknown number of JNG-90s
- Saudi Arabia: Purchased unknown number of JNG-90s
