= Pakistan Ordnance Factories =

Pakistani State owned weapons manufacturer

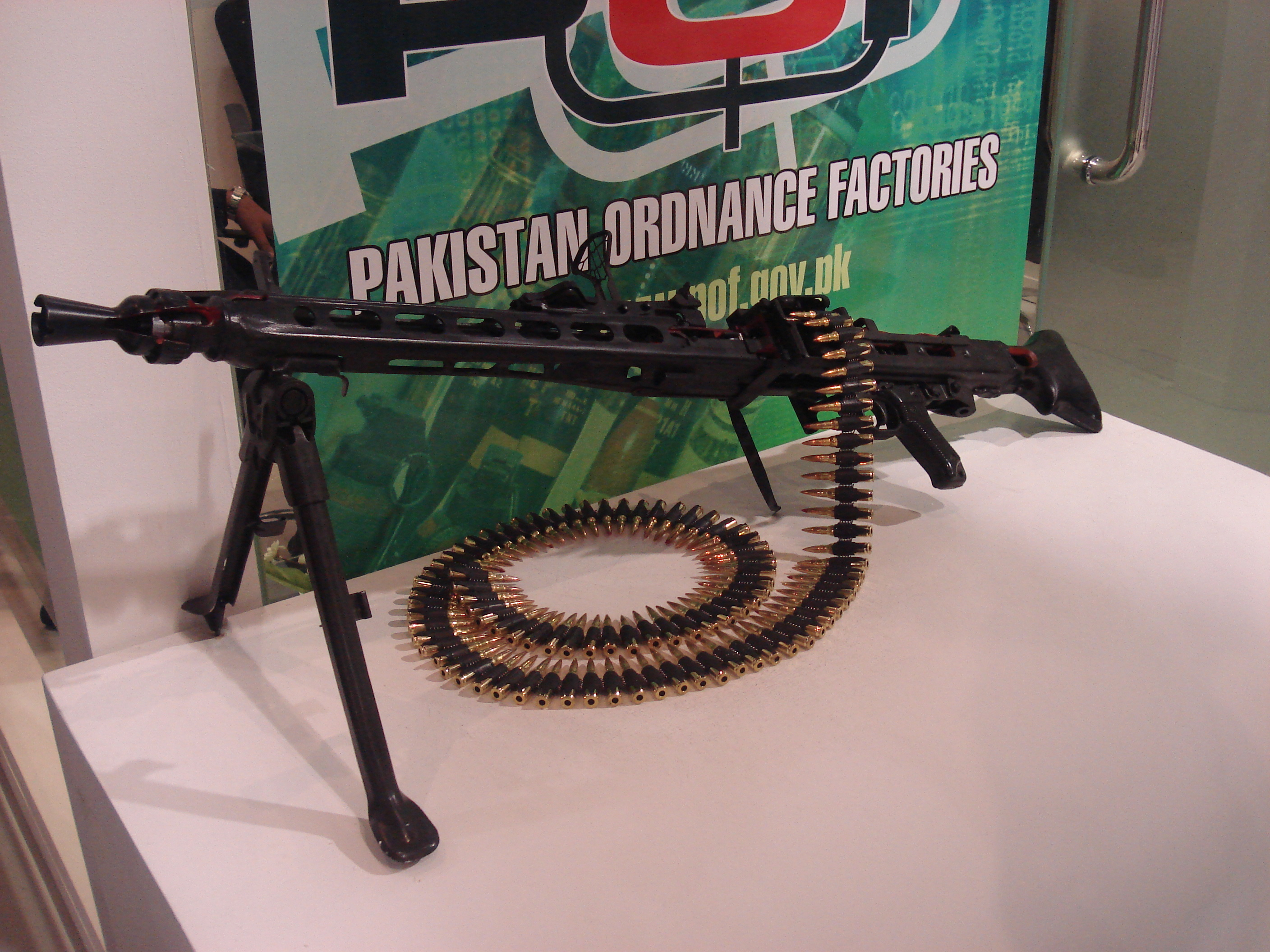
- A Rheinmetall MG 3 produced under license by POF
- Native name: Urdu: پاکستان آرڈیننس فیکٹریاں
- Type: State-owned enterprise
- Industry: Arms Industry
- Founded: 28 December 1951
- Headquarters: Wah Cantonment, Punjab, Pakistan
- Area served: Worldwide
- Key people: Lt General Nadeem Ashraf, HI(M) (Chairman)
- Owner: MoDP, Government of Pakistan
- Website: www.pof.gov.pk POF Youtube Channel

The Pakistan Ordnance Factories (commonly abbreviated as POF) is a state-owned manufacturing complex headquartered in Wah Cantt, Punjab, Pakistan.

== History ==
During their colonial rule, the British built sixteen ordnance factories in the British Raj, all of which were inherited by India upon the partition of the subcontinent in 1947.

Pakistan's first Prime Minister, Liaquat Ali Khan, issued a directive within four months of the formation of Pakistan to establish an ordnance factory in collaboration with British Royal Ordnance Factory to manufacture 0.303 calibre rifles.

On 28 December 1951 Pakistan's Second Prime Minister, Khawaja Nazimuddin, inaugurated the first four workshops.

POF at received the machinery from ROF Fazakerley in the UK to produce the Lee Enfield No.4 rifle. These rifles operated on the 0.303 calibre cartridges.

A stamp was also issued by Pakistan Post on the occasion of the golden jubilee of POF, on 28 December 2001, to honour POF's services.

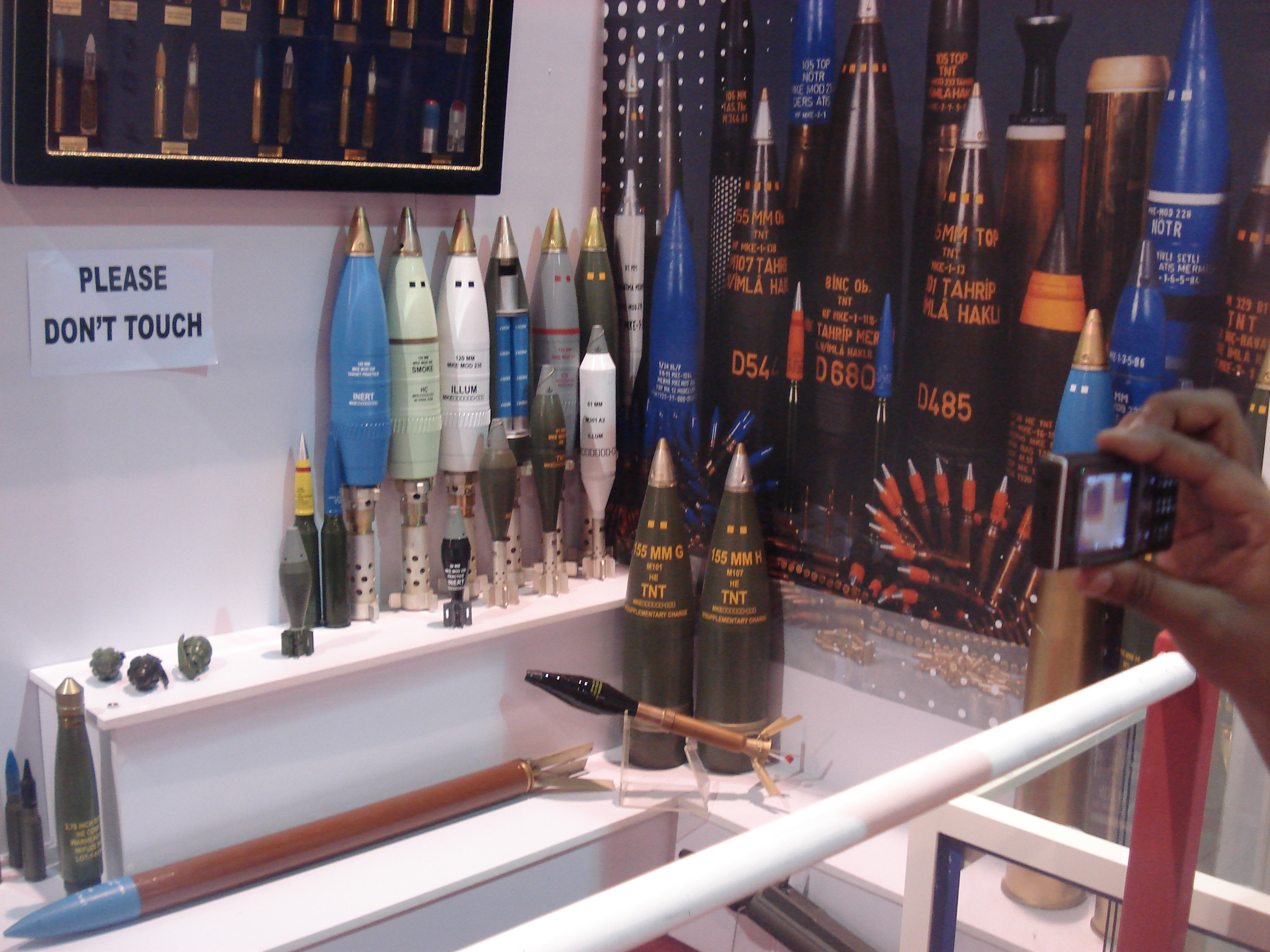
A variety of grenades, artillery shells, mortar shells and other ammunition produced by POF, on display at the IDEAS 2008 Defence Exhibition in Karachi, Pakistan.

== Products ==
The POF produces multiple weapons under license from other defense manufacturers such as Heckler and Koch, Beretta, NORINCO as well as having its own extensive R&D. The POF produces ammunition & armaments that meet requirements set by NATO specification.

== Customers ==
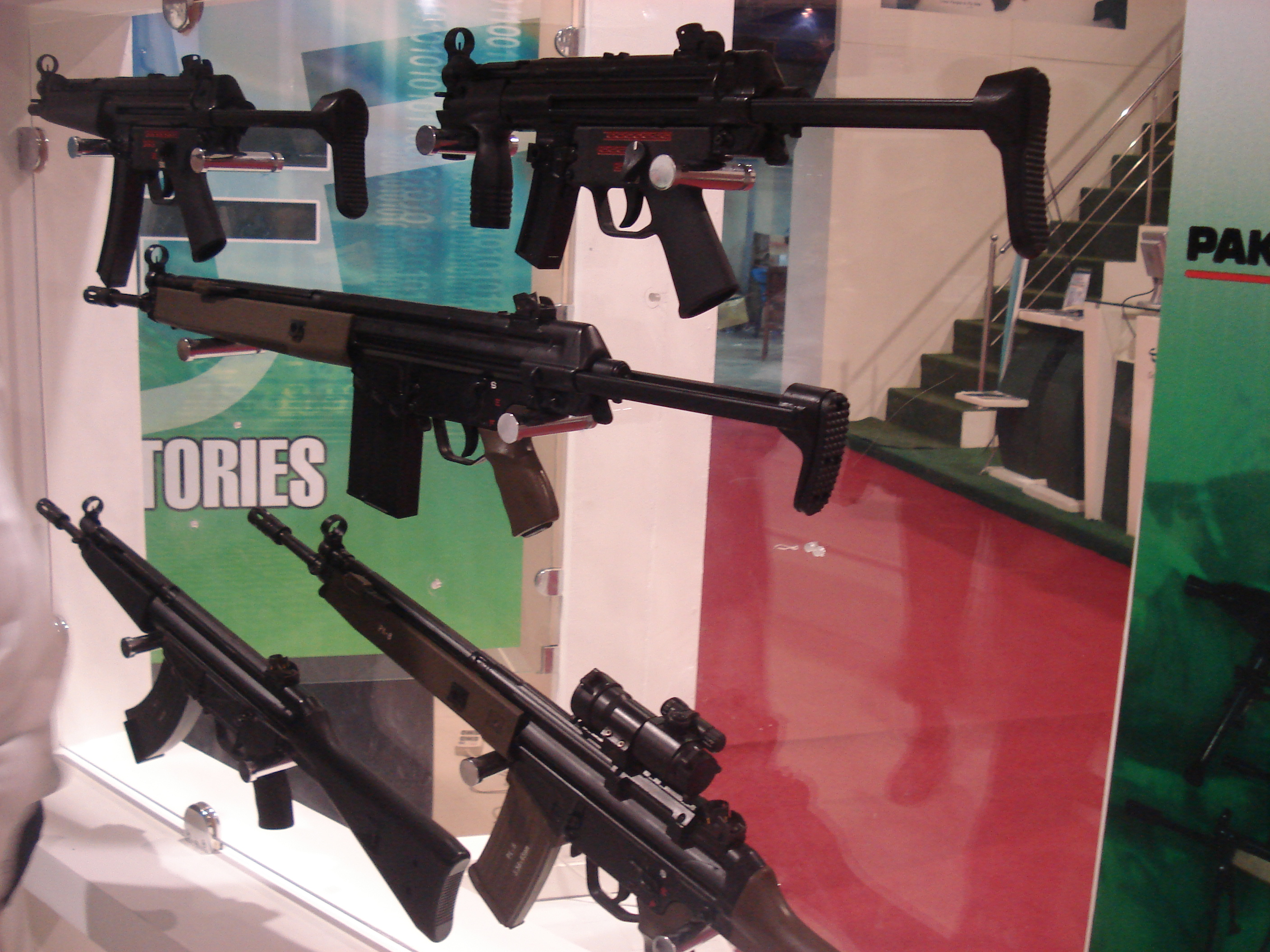
Several HK MP5 and HK G3 variants produced by POF on display at an exhibition

=== Civil Trade ===
POF is also produces arms and armaments for sports shooting, hunting and self-defense. POF has the exclusive rights to produce prohibited-bore weapons in Pakistan. POF produces multiple arms and ammunitions under license from other defense manufacturers such as heckler and koch, Beretta, NORINCO among others

=== Exports ===
POF products are in service with over 40 countries in Europe, Africa, Asia, the Middle East and the Americas. Ammunition and rifles have been exported to countries such as Ukraine, Iraq, Croatia and Afghanistan for their respective military establishments.

During the Russo-Ukrainian War, BBC Urdu claimed that POF has allegedly exported arms and ammunition, worth $364 Million, to armed forced of Ukraine. The various type of ammunition provided are 122mm Yarmuk HE-Frag rockets, 122mm howitzer shells, 155mm artillery shells, M4A2 propelling bag charges, M82 primers, PDM fuses, M44A2 120mm HE mortar bombs, 130mm shells, 40mm RPG7 HEAT ammo, 12.7×99mm armor piercing cartridges, 12.7×108mm bullets, and 7.62×54mmR bullets.

== Incidents ==
=== August 2008 bombing ===
On 21 August 2008, POF's industrial complex was the target of twin suicide bombings by the Tehrik-i-Taliban; 68 people were killed and 81 injured in the attack.

== See also ==
- List of products of Pakistan Ordnance Factories
- Ministry of Defense Production
- Heavy Industries Taxila
- Karachi Shipyard & Engineering Works
- Pakistan Aeronautical Complex
- National Radio and Telecommunication corporation
