= Jayanta Narayan Choudhury =

Indian police officer

Director General of the National Security Guard Jayanto Narayan Choudhury
- Born: 5 May 1955 (age 71); Lucknow
- Education: Delhi School of Economics; Delhi University
- Police career
- Country: Director General (National Security Guard)
- Department: National Security Guard; Intelligence Bureau (India); Assam Police
- Service years: 1978-2020
- Status: Retired
- Rank: Director General (National Security Guard)

Jayanto Narayan Choudhury (born 5 May 1955), also known as Jayanta Narayan Choudhury or J N Choudhury (Assamese: জয়ন্ত নাৰায়ন চৌধুৰী) is a 1978 batch (31RR) IPS officer of Assam-Meghalaya cadre.

Choudhury served as the Director of National Security Guard (NSG), India from 22 January 2014 to 31 May 2015.

Post retirement from the National Security Guard, the GAIL(India) Limited appointed Jayanto Narayan Choudhury as the company's Independent Director.

== Early life and education ==
Jayanta Narayan Choudhury was born on 5 May 1955. Choudhury's father was an Indian Army officer, and so he had to travel several places in his childhood along with his family. Though he was born in Lucknow, he was brought up in Nalbari of Assam. Choudhury's journey in childhood continued from Lucknow to Nalbari and Shillong. He had his basic educations in Darjeeling, Shillong, and Ajmer.

== Police career ==
Choudhury, a 1978 batch Assam-Meghalaya cadre IPS, worked in various departments in different capacities at the national level.

Choudhury joined the IB in 1985. Choudhury served as Additional director of the Intelligence Bureau till 2011. Before that, Choudhury served as the Superintendent of police (SP) of North Lakhimpur district from June 1983 to June 1985.

Choudhury assumed the charge of the Director General of Police of Assam on the very first day of 2012.

In 2014, he left over the charge of the DGP of Assam Police and took the charge of 28th Director General of NSG.

== See also ==
- Director General of the National Security Guard
- M. A. Ganapathy (police officer)
- Ranjit Shekhar Mooshahary
