= Corner Shot =

Corner Shot may refer to:

- Corner Shot Holdings, LLC company, which makes the following product:
  - CornerShot weapon accessory
