= M. A. Ganapathy (police officer) =

Indian police officer

M A Ganapathy IPS
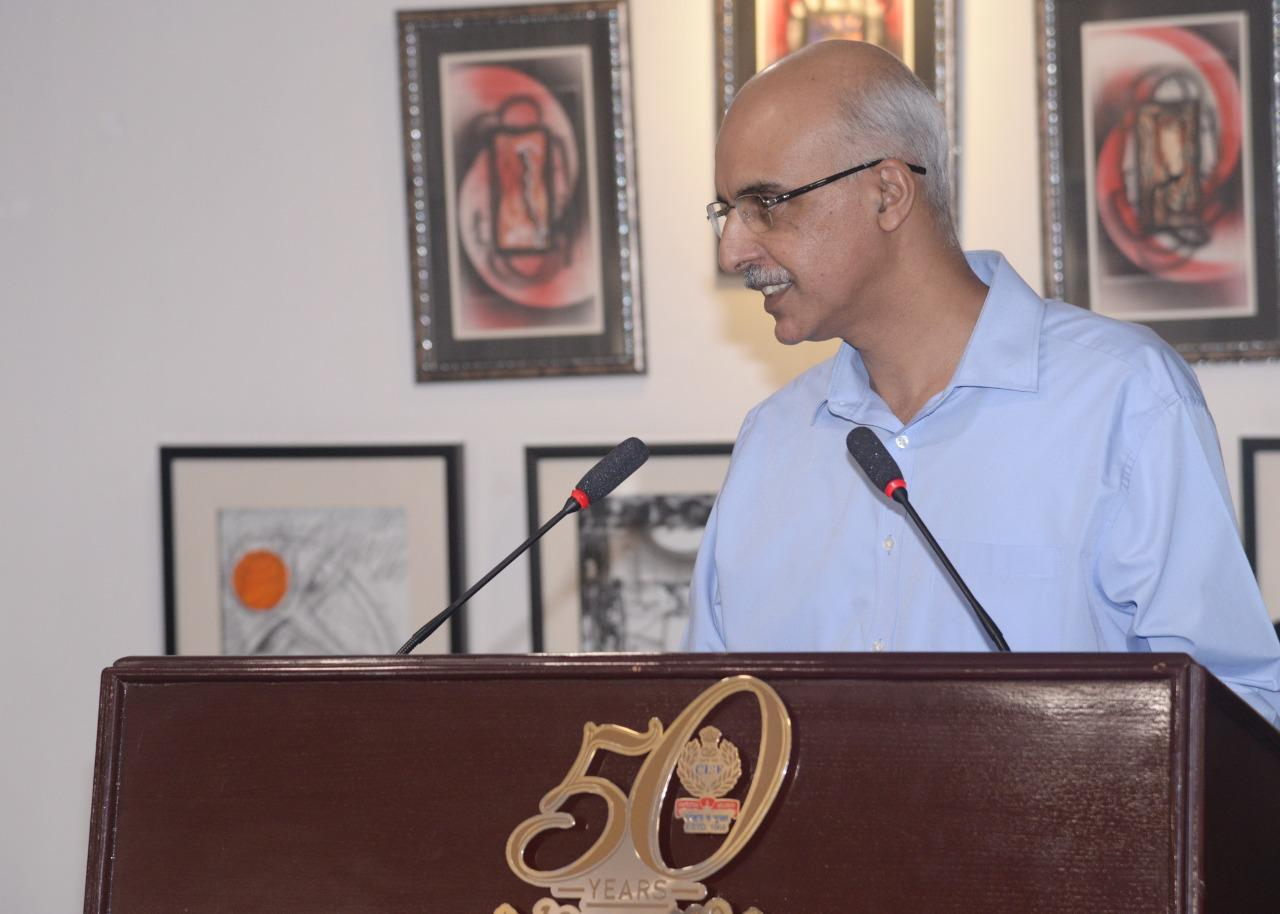
- Born: 1 March 1964 (age 62); Kodagu (Coorg)
- Education: Graduation in Economics; Post Graduation in International Studies; LLB
- Occupations: Director General
- Organization: National Security Guard (NSG)
- Awards: Police Medal for Meritorious Services (2002) ; President's Police Medal for Distinguished Services (2010)

M. A. Ganapathy (born 1 March 1964) is a retired Indian Police Service Officer of the 1986 batch of Uttarakhand cadre, served as the Director General of the National Security Guard from 18 March 2021 to 29 February 2024. He has previously served as Director General of Bureau of Civil Aviation Security and Director General of Police, Uttarakhand.

== Early life and education ==
M. A. Ganapathy was born in Kodagu (Coorg) district, Karnataka. He completed his school education in Kodagu. He graduated in Economics from Madras Christian College, Chennai (1984) and did his Master's degree in International Studies from Jawahar Lal Nehru University, Delhi (1986). He also holds a Degree in Law from University of Delhi (2007).

== Career in Indian Police Service ==
=== Uttar Pradesh ===
M. A. Ganapathy was initially allotted Uttar Pradesh Cadre and served there between 1987 and 1999. During this period, inter-alia, he worked as Senior/Superintendent of Police in districts like Kanpur City, Meerut, Allahabad, Nainital, Hardoi, Sonebhadra etc. The policing challenges in these assignments were varied and included tackling communal issues, city policing, serious crimes investigation, anti-dacoity operations, naxal problem etc.

=== Central Bureau of Investigation ===
M. A. Ganapathy served in the CBI as SP/DIG between 1999 and 2007. During this period, as SP he supervised the enquiry into allegations of Cricket match fixing (2000), which culminated in action against certain cricketers by the BCCI. M A Ganapathy features in a book on Cricket match fixing by sports journalist Ed Hawkins titled Bookie, Gambler, Fixer, Spy: A journey into the heart of crickets underworld (Bloomsbury, 2012), where his role as investigator in the cricket match fixing enquiry of CBI in 2000 is discussed in detail. Subsequently, upon promotion, M A Ganapathy was DIG of Anti-Corruption-I, Delhi, which investigates corruption cases.

=== Uttarakhand ===
M. A. Ganapathy was allocated Uttarakhand cadre after the creation of the new State in 2000. He served there in various capacities as IG Crime/Law & Order, IG Garhwal Range, IG Haridwar Mahakumbh-2010, etc. He was appointed as DGP of Uttarakhand in May, 2016 at the age of 53. During his tenure as DGP, he focused on rules based policing and also introduced many community policing models based on local needs.

=== Ministry of Home Affairs ===
M. A. Ganapathy served as Joint Secretary, Left Wing Extremism and Joint Secretary, Internal Security-I, MHA, between 2011 and 2016. As JS, LWE, he supervised implementation of projects like fortified police stations, installation of telecom towers, up-gradation of special forces, etc. in LWE affected States. He also formulated the initial draft of the comprehensive policy framework of the Central Government's Counter LWE strategy (National Policy and Action Plan-2015). As Joint Secretary, Internal Security, he was instrumental in drafting the National Security Clearance Policy of MHA (2015). He also took part in various JWG deliberations on Counter Terrorism and Financial Action Task Force (FATF) plenary sessions.

=== Central Industrial Security Force ===
M. A. Ganapathy served as Spl. DG/ADG, Airport Sector, CISF, between 2017 and 2020. During this period introduction of state of the art technology in aviation security became a focus area. Also, steps were initiated to downsize manpower in Airport Security through rationalization and use of technology. The professional competence of CISF personnel was also up-graded through training collaboration with global leaders in aviation security.

=== Bureau of Civil Aviation Security ===
M. A. Ganapathy served as DG, BCAS between 2020 and 2021.

=== National Security Guard ===
M. A. Ganapathy was appointed as Director General of the National Security Guard on 18 March 2021 and served their till 29 February 2024.

== Training ==
- National Security and Strategic Affairs, National Defence College, Delhi (2006)
- Oxford University Programme on 'Negotiations' (2012)
- Harvard University, Kennedy School Programme on 'Leadership in the 21st century: Chaos, Conflict and Courage (2013)

== Awards/commendations ==
- Police Medal for Meritorious Services (2002).
- President's Police Medal for Distinguished Services (2010).

== Articles and publications ==
- "A virtuous process needed to stop the evil" (article on cricket match-fixing). Deccan Herald. 25 May 2013.
- "A tryst with wild places: A police officer rates roaming the forests as his best non-professional reward". The Hindu. 29 January 2023.
- In the abode of lovely nature. https://www.thehindu.com/opinion/open-page/in-the-abode-of-lovely-nature/article68725241.ece There is a gentle breeze that blows ever so often from the Kunda Betta and the old trees sway gently, as if in sheer delight. Published - October 13, 2024 02:58 am IST M.A. Ganapathy
- ‘Networked X-ray machines for baggage checks are the best answer to hoax bomb threats’ https://timesofindia.indiatimes.com/blogs/toi-edit-page/networked-x-ray-machines-for-baggage-checks-are-the-best-answer-to-hoax-bomb-threats/ The ongoing deluge of threats to airlines is unprecedented. Ex-IPS officer MA Ganapathy, who headed NSG, BCAS & airport sector of CISF, tells TOI, tech solutions that can isolate and play back images of flight baggage for review will minimise flight diversions when faced with such threats.
- "NSG ex-chief MA Ganapathy talks about his new book. Ideal cop, beautiful locations, the supernatural" Former National Security Guard Chief- M A Ganapathy has written a book called 'Whisper in the Shadows’ that chronicles the journey of a police officer, Avinash, and a paranormal twist. In this conversation with Bismee Taskin, Ganapathy sheds light on the facts behind fiction, how Avinash is his alter ego and why he added supernatural elements to his book.3 Feb 2025.
- "Exploring the Paranormal with M.A Ganapathy" A talk with M.A.Ganapathy, Ex NSG Chief about his new book 'Whispers in the Shadows: Paranormal Experiences of a Policeman' and about his childhood in Coorg/ Kodagu, in conversation with Anindya Somaiah.7 Feb 2025
- "The Master Storyteller IPS Officer Leaves Readers Guessing | M A Ganapathy |" MA Ganapathy, the 1986-batch IPS officer, Ex NSG Chief and former DGP of Uttarakhand talks about his debut book, a compilation of stories: Whispers in the Shadows – Paranormal Encounters Of A Policeman''. 3 Feb 2025
- "Conducting Haridwar Mahakumbh in 2010 Was More Challenging Than 2025 Mahakumbh M.A Ganapathy, IPS" M.A Ganapathy, the 1986-batch IPS officer, Ex NSG Chief and former DGP of Uttarakhand discussed how he investigated the match fixing as SP CBI and conducted the Haridwar, Mahakumbh in 2010 without any untoward incident." 17 Feb 2025
- "Ex-NSG DG Ganapathy pens collection of short stories" A collection of short stories authored by M A Ganapathy, former Director General of National Security Guard (NSG), is a mix of policing incidents and the paranormal.14 December 2024
- "Spirits In The North Block And Stranger Things!" The book titled 'Whispers in the Shadows', by M A GANAPATHY, Ex NSG Chief chronicling the strange escapades of Avinash, the protagonist police officer in the stories is making waves and attracting attention due to the unusual nature of its content. 22 Jan 2025.
- Murder mysteries with spooky twists: NSG ex-chief M A Ganapathy’s book treads a road less travelled. Unlike cops who describe their achievements by recounting their careers in a book after retirement, M A Ganapathy has chosen to fictionalise his professional experiences. https://indianexpress.com/article/india/murder-mysteries-spooky-twists-nsg-ex-chief-m-a-ganapathys-book-9737553/
- Ex-NSG chief debut novel chronicles his brush with the 'supernatural'. Retired IPS officer M.A. Ganapathy debuts with 'Whispers in the Shadows,' a collection of paranormal short stories. Drawing inspiration from Ruskin Bond, Ganapathy's tales explore spooky encounters in various settings, from his native Coorg to his alma mater. The protagonist, Avinash, mirrors Ganapathy's own life, narrating chilling, often incredible experiences with the supernatural. https://timesofindia.indiatimes.com/india/ex-nsg-chief-debut-novel-chronicles-his-brush-with-the-supernatural/articleshow/116322494.cms
- ‘Whispers in the Shadows’ book review: An unusual-yet-captivating supernatural read that humanises the police. Ex-NSG chief M.A. Ganapathy takes the supernatural route in his debut work, ‘Whispers in the Shadows: Paranormal Encounters of a Policeman’. https://www.theweek.in/review/books/2024/12/30/ma-ganapathy-debut-book-Whispers-in-the-Shadows-book-review.html
- Whispers in the Shadows: Ex-NSG DG Ganapathy pens short stories on policing, paranormal. The stories in "Whispers in the Shadows" relate to adventures of a low-profile and conscientious police officer named Avinash.https://newsmeter.in/lifestyle/whispers-in-the-shadows-ex-nsg-dg-ganapathy-pens-short-stories-on-policing-paranormal-740626

== See also ==
- Director General of the National Security Guard
- Jayanta Narayan Choudhury
- Ranjit Shekhar Mooshahary
