= Prahaar =

Prahaar may refer to:

- Prahar, unit of time in India
- Prahaar (missile), a tactical ballistic missile of India
- Prahaar (newspaper), an Indian Marathi-language newspaper
- Prahaar: The Final Attack, a 1991 Indian Hindi-language film
- PRAHAAR, India's national counter-terrorism strategy

== See also ==
- Prohor, a 2002 Indian Bengali-language film
