= Organisation for Counter Terrorist Operations =

- Abbreviation: OCTOPUS

Agency overview
- Formed: 1 October 2007
- Employees: 1700

Jurisdictional structure
- Operations jurisdiction: Andhra Pradesh & Telangana, India
- General nature: Local civilian police
- Specialist jurisdiction: Counter terrorism, special weapons operations; protection of internationally protected persons, other very important persons, or state property

Operational structure
- Headquarters: Khalsa Ibrahimpatnam Village, Hyderabad, India

The Organisation for Counter Terrorist Operations (OCTOPUS) is an elite counter terrorism joint unit of the Andhra Pradesh Police in the state of Andhra Pradesh & and the Telangana Police in the state of Telangana in India.

== History ==
On 1 October 2007, the Andhra Pradesh cabinet approved the formation of OCTOPUS.

== Headquarters ==
OCTOPUS Commando Training Center was inaugurated on 13 August 2012, Andhra Pradesh Chief Minister Nallari Kiran Kumar Reddy at Khalsa Ibrahimpatnam Village near Hyderabad, with 570 acres land area. Before this, they had been based at a makeshift headquarters.

== Achievements ==
- AP OCTOPUS commandos have secured first place in a competition conducted by NSG under the scheme Agni Pariksha 7 in 2021.
- They won the championship by scoring more points than NSG and other elite security forces in the competition.

== Training ==
The commandos are trained in handling sophisticated weapons such as Glock-19 pistols, Colt 9mm SMG, Franchi SPAS-15 dual mode shotguns, sniper rifles, taser guns and corner shot systems.

On 16 November 2012, tenders were invited for the supply of a sample jet pack unit to the OCTOPUS. Plans have been made to acquire more jetpacks in the future.

== Organisation and role ==
About 100 OCTOPUS personnel have been deployed at the Tirumala Venkateswara temple to oversee the temple security.

== Deployment ==
- October 2013 armed terrorists in Puttur of Chittoor district in the erstwhile AP

=== After Telangana formation ===
- July 2017 Muthoot Finance at Happy Homes apartment complex armed robbery.

== After bifurcation ==
Of the 1590 commandos for the OCTOPUS, the force was divided on the basis of options exercised by the staff

== See also ==
- Greyhounds (police)
- Force One
- Special Tactical Unit
