= Director General of the National Security Guard =

Head of the Indian National Security Guard

Director General of National Security Guard
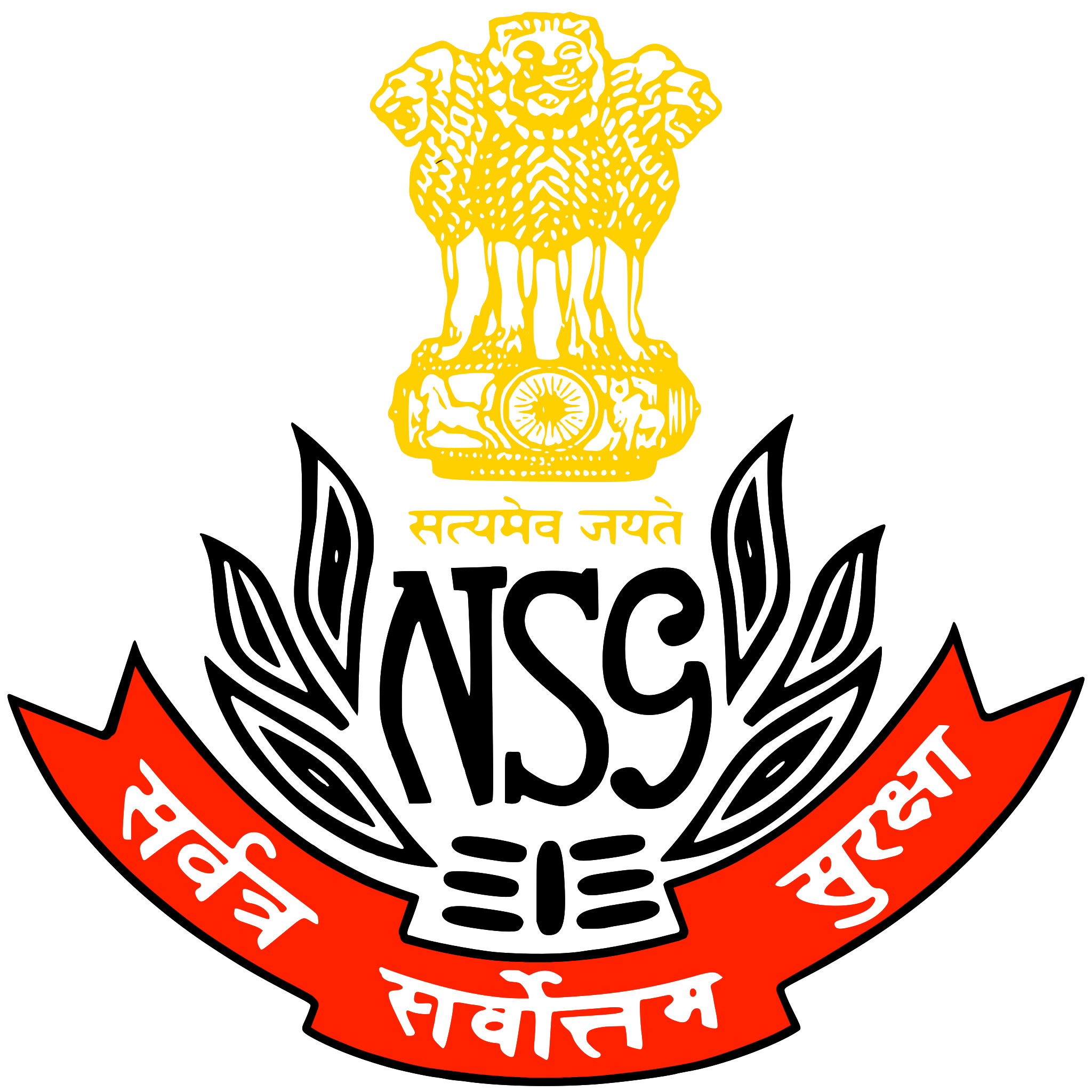
- Emblem of the National Security Guard

- Flag of the National Security Guard
- Incumbent; B.Srinivasan, IPS since 28 August 2024
- Ministry of Home Affairs; National Security Guard
- Type: Paramilitary Force
- Status: Active
- Abbreviation: D.G.
- Residence: New Delhi Delhi
- Seat: NSG HQ, Mehram Nagar, Palam
- Nominator: Ministry of Home Affairs
- Appointer: President of India
- Term length: 29 Feb 2024
- Formation: August 1984
- First holder: R. T. Nagrani
- Deputy: Additional Director-General; Inspector-General
- Website: DG National Security Guard

The Director General of the National Security Guard is the head of the National Security Guard (NSG), the federal contingency deployment force that was created to deal with counter terrorism in India. The DG is selected by the Home Minister (MHA). In the first thirty-one years since its creation in 1984, the NSG has had twenty-eight DGs, with an average tenure of one year and few months. All the selected DGs have been officers from the Indian Police Service (IPS).

Director General of NSG(essentially from IPS) is equivalent in rank to a lieutenant general in the Army, an air marshal in the Air Force, or a vice admiral in the Navy, all three-star ranks.

The Director General is assisted, for administrative matters, by four IG Rank officers drawn from the Indian Police Service and also from the Indian Army of whom two are Inspectors General each for Administration and Headquarters (HQ) who in turn are assisted by Deputy Inspectors General. The Financial Advisor of the NSG has been an officer of the rank of Joint Secretary from one of the Central Accounts Services and also has Dy Advisors from these Central Accounts Services.

== List of Directors General ==
S.No	Name	Cadre	Batch	Appointment Date	Left office	Notes	Parent Service
1	R. T. Nagrani	Andhra Pradesh	1951	17 August 1984	25 September 1986		Indian Police Service
2	K. L. Watts	Uttar Pradesh	1956	28 January 1987	31 December 1987		Indian Police Service
3	V. P. Marwah	Union Territory	1956	15 April 1988	15 April 1988		Indian Police Service
4	S. Subramanian	Andhra Pradesh	1958	14 May 1990	31 January 1992		Indian Police Service
5	B. J. S. Sial	Uttar Pradesh	1959	19 May 1992	31 July 1993		Indian Police Service
6	A. K. Tandon	Gujarat	1961	28 April 1994	19 March 1997		Indian Police Service
7	R. D. Tyagi	Maharashtra	1964	19 March 1997	31 October 1997		Indian Police Service
8	T. R. Kakkar	Arunachal Pradesh-Goa-Mizoram	1964	6 May 1998	6 May 1998		Indian Police Service
9	Nikhil Kumar	Arunachal Pradesh-Goa-Mizoram	1963	1 July 1999	31 July 2001		Indian Police Service
10	Dr. R. Rajagopalan	Tamil Nadu	1965	20 August 2001	12 January 2002		Indian Police Service
11	Ranjit Shekhar Mooshahary	Kerala	1967	13 February 2002	7 February 2005		Indian Police Service
12	A. K. Mitra	Uttar Pradesh	1970	7 February 2005	27 February 2006		Indian Police Service
13	Jyoti Krishan Dutt	West Bengal	1971	11 August 2006	28 February 2009		Indian Police Service
14	N. P. S. Aulakh	Punjab	1972	28 February 2009	31 August 2010		Indian Police Service
15	Rajan K. Medhekar	Kerala	1975	1 September 2010	30 April 2012		Indian Police Service
16	Subhash Joshi	Uttarakhand	1976	3 May 2012	18 December 2012		Indian Police Service
17	Arvind Ranjan	Kerala	1977	18 December 2012	22 January 2014		Indian Police Service
18	J. N. Choudhury	Assam-Meghalaya	1978	22 January 2014	31 May 2015		Indian Police Service
19	R. C. Tayal	Assam-Meghalaya	1980	31 May 2015	22 September 2016		Indian Police Service
20	Sudhir Pratap Singh	Rajasthan	1983	23 September 2016	31 January 2018		Indian Police Service
21	Sudeep Lakhtakia	Telangana	1984	31 January 2018	18 October 2019		Indian Police Service
22	Anup Kumar Singh	Gujarat	1985	18 October 2019	30 September 2020		Indian Police Service
23	M A Ganapathy	Uttarakhand	1986	18 March 2021	29 February 2024		Indian Police Service
25	Nalin Prabhat	Andhra Pradesh	1992	1 May 2024	15 August 2024		Indian Police Service
26	B. Srinivasan	Bihar	1992	28 August 2024	Incumbent		Indian Police Service
