= B. Srinivasan =

Head of the Indian National Security Guard

Director General of National Security Guard
- Incumbent
- Assumed office 28 August 2024
- Preceded by: Nalin Prabhat

Personal details
- Born: 16 August 1967 (age 58) India
- Occupation: IPS
- Police career
- Department: National Security Guard
- Service years: 1992 - present
- Rank: Director General

Brighu Srinivasan (born 16 August 1967) is an IPS officer (1992 Batch) of the Bihar cadre. He is currently serving as the Director General of National Security Guard from 28 August 2024. Prior to his appointment as Director General of NSG he was serving as Director at Bihar Police Academy. In his early police career, Srinivasan served in Kashmir for three decades.

Srinivasan will be empaneled to HAG+ Scale (pay level 16) as Director General of NSG.
