= Sandeep Unnikrishnan =

Indian army officer (1977–2008)

Major Sandeep Unnikrishnan AC
- Sandeep Unnikrishnan
- Born: 15 March 1977; Kozhikode, Kerala, India
- Died: 28 November 2008 (aged 31); Mumbai, Maharashtra, India
- Burial place: Bengaluru, Karnataka, India
- Alma mater: The Frank Anthony Public School, Bangalore; National Defence Academy; Indian Military Academy; High Altitude Warfare School; Commando School Belgaum
- Military career
- Allegiance: India
- Branch: Indian Army
- Service years: 1999–2008
- Rank: Major
- Service number: IC-58660
- Units: 51 SAG, NSG; 7 Bihar, Bihar Regiment
- Conflicts: Operation Vijay; Operation Parakram; Operation Rakshak; Counter-Insurgency; Operation Black Tornado
- Awards: Ashoka Chakra; Operation Parakram Medal; Special Service Medal; Sainya Seva Medal; High Altitude Medal; 9 Years Long Service Medal

Major Sandeep Unnikrishnan, AC (15 March 1977 – 28 November 2008) was an Indian Army officer, who was serving in the 51 Special Action Group of the National Security Guard on deputation. He was killed in action during the 2008 Mumbai attacks and was posthumously awarded the Ashoka Chakra, India's highest peacetime gallantry award, on 26 January 2009.

== Early and personal life ==
Maj. Sandeep Unnikrishnan, AC(P) came from a Malayali family residing in Bangalore, where they had moved from Kozhikode, Kerala. He was the only son of retired ISRO officer K. Unnikrishnan and Dhanalakshmi Unnikrishnan.

Maj. Sandeep studied at The Frank Anthony Public School, Bangalore, graduating in 1995 in the ISC Science stream. He wanted to join the armed forces from childhood. He was married to Neha.

== Military career ==
Maj. Sandeep Unnikrishnan, AC(P) joined the National Defence Academy (India) (NDA), Khadakwasla, Pune, Maharashtra in 1995. He was a part of the Oscar Squadron (No. 4 Battalion) and a graduate of the 94th Course NDA. He held a Bachelor of Arts degree.

In the Indian Military Academy (IMA), Dehradun, he was part of the 104th regular course. On 12 June 1999, he graduated from the IMA and got commissioned as Lieutenant in the 7th Battalion of the Bihar Regiment (Infantry) of Indian Army. During Operation Vijay in July 1999, he was regarded positively at the forward posts in the face of heavy artillery firing and small arms fire by Pakistan troops. On the evening of 31 December 1999, he led a team of six soldiers and established a post 200 metres from the opposing side and under direct observation and fire.

He received a substantive promotion to Captain on 12 June 2003, followed by promotion to the rank of Major on 13 June 2005. During the 'Ghatak course' (at the Infantry wing Commando School, Belgaum), he topped the course twice earning an "Instructor" grading and a Commendation.

He was also trained at the High Altitude Warfare School, Gulmarg. After serving in different locations including Siachen, Jammu and Kashmir, Gujarat (during 2002 Gujarat Riots), Hyderabad and Rajasthan, he was selected to join the National Security Guards. On completion of training, he was assigned as the training officer of the 51 Special Action Group (51 SAG) of NSG, in January 2007 and also participated in various operations of the NSG.

=== Operation Black Tornado ===
On the night of 26 November 2008, several buildings in South Mumbai were attacked. One of the buildings where hostages were held was the iconic 100-year-old Taj Mahal Palace Hotel. Major Sandeep Unnikrishnan, AC(P) was the team commander of 51 Special Action Group (51 SAG) deployed at the Taj hotel to rescue the hostages. He entered the hotel with a group of 10 commandos and reached the sixth floor through the staircase. After evacuating hostages from the sixth and fifth floors, as the team descended the stairs, they suspected terrorists in a room on fourth floor, which was locked from the inside. As the commandos broke open the door, the round of fire by the terrorists hit Commando Sunil Kumar Yadav in both legs. Major Sandeep managed to save and evacuate Yadav, but terrorists disappeared after blasting a grenade inside the room. Major Sandeep and his team continued evacuating hostages from the hotel, for around 15 hours. On 27 November, around midnight, Major Sandeep Unnikrishnan and his team decided to take the path of the central staircase of hotel to go up, as it was their only path towards the hostages and terrorists. As expected, when terrorists saw commandos coming up through the central staircase, they ambushed NSG team, from the first floor, in which 27-year-old Commando Sunil Kumar Jodha was grievously injured by seven bullets (three in the left hand, one on his right palm, two in the right shoulder and one in his chest). Major Sandeep arranged for his evacuation and continued to engage terrorists in the firefight. He then decided to chase terrorists alone, as they were trying to escape to the next floor. In the encounter that followed, he managed to corner all four terrorists to the Ballroom in the northern end of Taj Mahal hotel, single-handedly but sacrificed his life in the course. His last words were, "Don't come up, I will handle them" according to the NSG officials. NSG commandos later killed all four terrorists trapped in the Ballroom and Wasabi restaurant of the Mumbai Taj hotel.

==== Ashoka Chakra citation ====
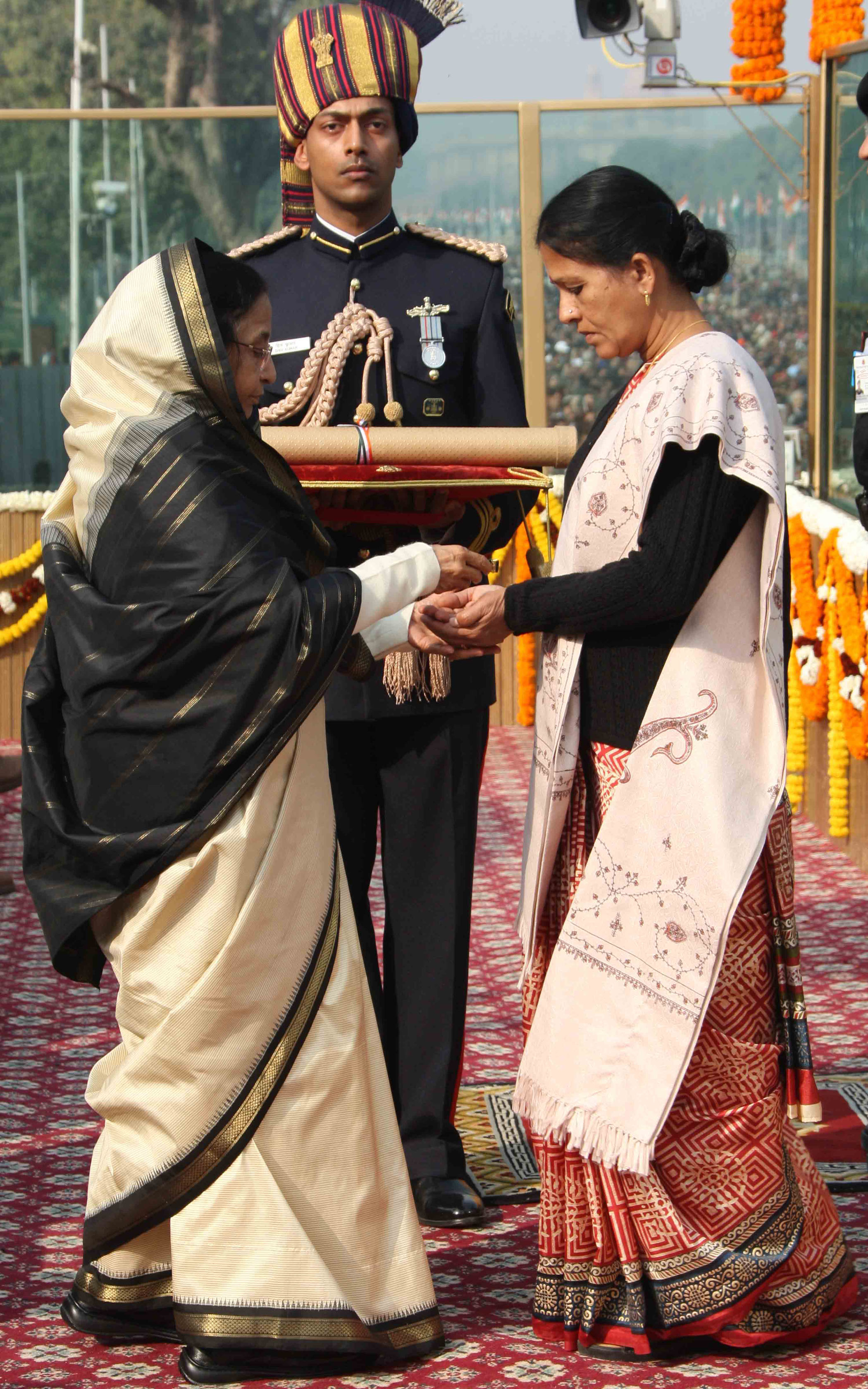
Sandeep's mother receiving the Ashoka Chakra from President Pratibha Patil on 26 January 2009

The official citation for the Ashoka Chakra Award reads:

IC-58660 MAJOR SANDEEP UNNIKRISHNAN BIHAR REGIMENT/51 SPECIAL ACTION GROUP (POSTHUMOUS)

Major Sandeep Unnikrishnan led the commando operation launched on 27th November 2008 to flush out terrorists from Hotel Taj Mahal, Mumbai in which he rescued 14 hostages.
During the operation, his team came under intense hostile fire, in which one of his team members got grievously injured. Major Sandeep pinned down the terrorists with accurate fire and rescued the injured commando to safety. In the process, he was shot in his right arm. Despite his injuries, he continued to fight the terrorists till his last breath.
Major Sandeep Unnikrishnan displayed most conspicuous bravery besides camaraderie and leadership of the highest order and made the supreme sacrifice for the nation.

== Funeral ==
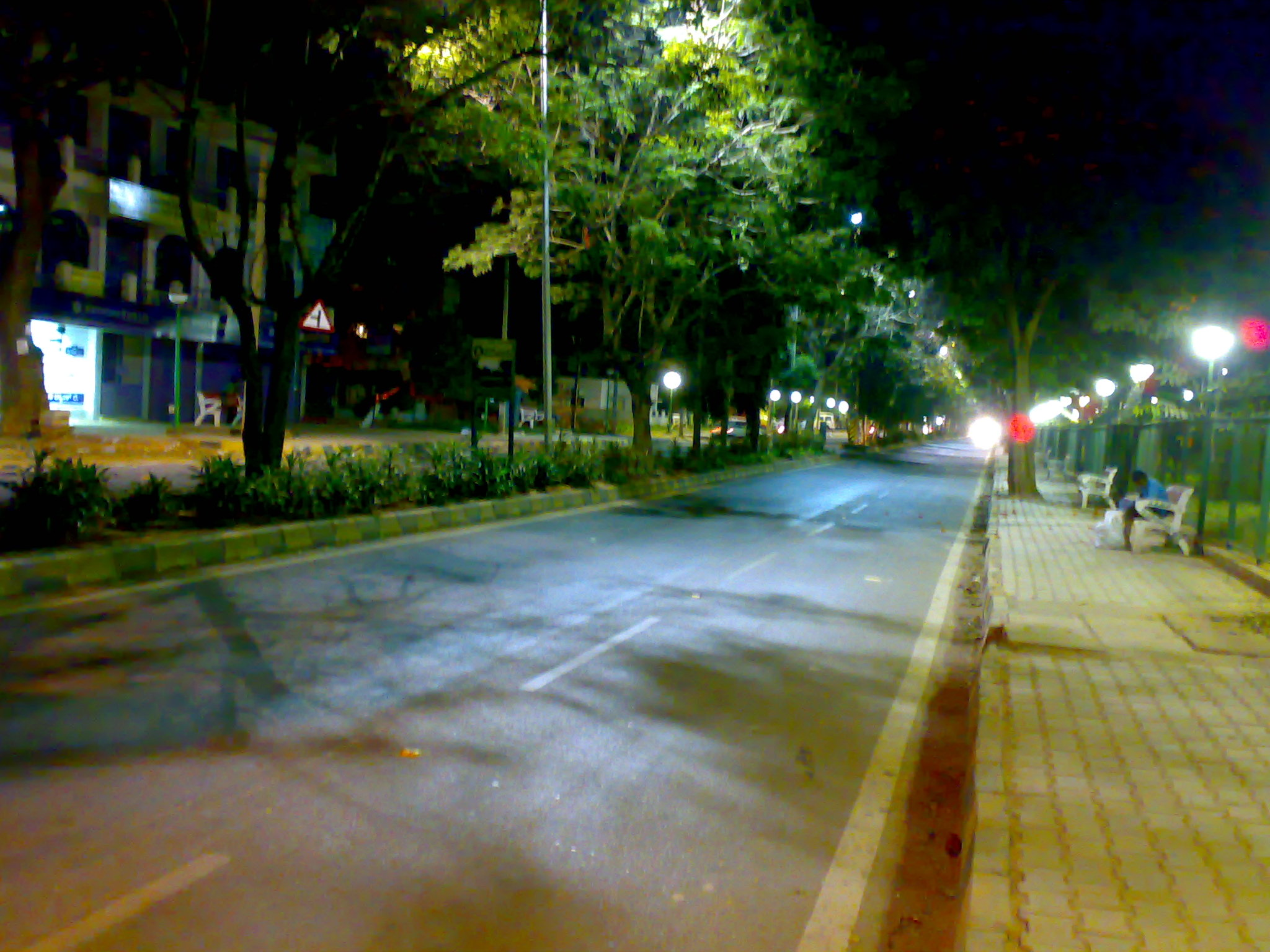
Major Sandeep Unnikrishnan Road in Yelahanka Newtown

At Major Sandeep's funeral, mourners chanted "Sandeep Unnikrishnan Amar Rahe" ("May Sandeep Unnikrishnan's name remain eternal"). Thousands of people lined up outside his Bangalore house to pay their respects. His funeral was held with full military honours.

== Honour and legacy ==
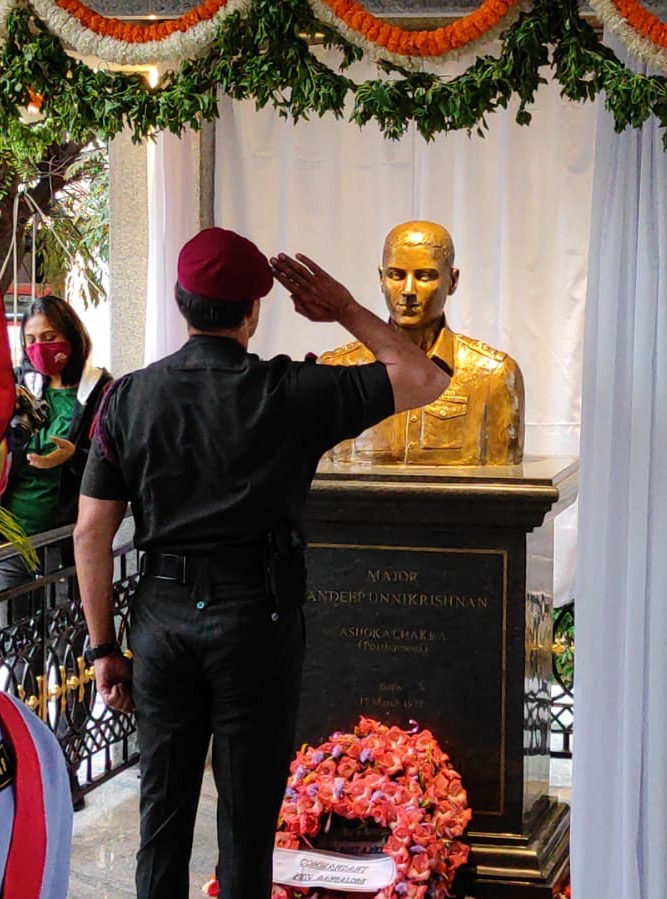
Bust of Major Sandeep Unnikrishnan at Sandeep Vihar, Bangalore

The Mother Dairy Double Road in Bengaluru, a 4.5 km (2.8 mi) stretch from Federal Mogul on Doddaballapur Road to MS Palya junction, within Yelahanka New Town, was renamed Major Sandeep Unnikrishnan Road in his honour. A bust of Major Sandeep Unnikrishnan is installed on Ramamurthy Nagar Outer Ring Road junction in Bangalore and is named in his honour.

There is a bust of Major Sandeep Unnikrishnan at the entrance of Indian Education Society on Jogeshwari Vikhroli Link Road, Mumbai. An army housing complex at Whitefield, Bangalore is named 'Sandeep Vihar' and a bust of Major Sandeep is installed in the center of Housing complex.

== In popular culture ==
A film, titled Major, stars Adivi Sesh in the title role of Major Sandeep Unnikrishnan. The film is produced by actor Mahesh Babu, Sony Pictures International Productions, and A+S Movies.

The principal photography of the film began in February 2020, and was released worldwide on 3 June 2022.
