= 51 Special Action Group =

Indian counter-terrorism unit

51 Special Action Group 51 SAG
- Common name: Top Men Team
- Motto: Sahas Ki Vijay; Bravery Wins

Agency overview
- Formed: 1985, 15 December
- Employees: The officers and troops come from various units of Army, trained in various commando courses.

Jurisdictional structure
- Federal agency: India
- Operations jurisdiction: India
- Governing body: Ministry of Home Affairs (India)
- Constituting instrument: National Security Guard Act, 1985
- General nature: Federal law enforcement

Operational structure
- Headquarters: New Delhi, India
- Agency executive: Colonel Himanshu Thakran from NAGA Regiment, Group Commander
- Parent agency: National Security Guard

Notables
- Significant operations: Operation Black Thunder; Operation Snow Storm; Operation Mouse Trap; Operation Black Tornado; Operation Cactus

The 51 Special Action Group is a special response unit of the National Security Guard (NSG) of India. It was raised by the Cabinet Secretariat under the National Security Guard Act of 1985.

The Special Action Group (SAG) comprises 54% of the National Security Guard. The 51 SAG forms the offensive arm, with personnel drawn from the Indian Army. The 51 SAG is tasked with counterterrorism operations, while the 52 SAG is trained and equipped for hostage rescue operations.

== Mission ==
51 Special Action Group's mission is part of the NSG's overall mission to neutralize specific terrorist threats in vital installations or any given area, handle hijack situations involving piracy in the air and on the land, engage and neutralize terrorists in specific situations, and to rescue hostages in kidnap situations.

== Composition ==
The unit is the smallest combat unit in the SAG counter-terrorist operations, and is called a hit. It has five members: two pairs, or partners and a technical support member. Four hits make a team which is under the command of a captain/team commander. The number of hits used for an intervention job depends on its complexity and the magnitude of the operation.

Recently, operational hubs have been raised in Metro cities: Mumbai, Chennai, Hyderabad, Kolkata and Gandhinagar, apart from its headquarters at Manesar (Haryana), near the capital New Delhi.

== Equipment ==
- HK MP5 and its variants such as the MP5SD3, MP5SD6, MP5K, and MP5-N
- Glock 19
- SIG Sauer P226
- SIG SG 550 and its variants
- Beretta 92
- Franchi SPAS-15 12 gauge combat shotgun
- PSG-1 sniper rifle
- MSG-90 sniper rifle

== Operation Black Tornado ==
During the 26/11 Mumbai attacks, the National Security Guard’s 51 Special Action Group conducted Operation Black Tornado, a multi-site counter-terrorism mission targeting locations including the Taj Mahal Palace Hotel, Oberoi Trident, and Nariman House. The deployment faced delays and was hindered by limited intelligence, lack of building layouts, and poor coordination. Tactical challenges included a failed helicopter insertion and reliance on media for situational updates. The operation lasted nearly 60 hours, resulting in casualties and highlighting systemic issues in preparedness and inter-agency communication.

== Operation Cactus ==
Operation Cactus, carried out on 3 November 1988, was a military response by India to a coup attempt in the Maldives. Armed rebels from the People's Liberation Organisation of Tamil Eelam (PLOTE) had taken control of key government sites in Malé. Following a request from the Maldivian government, Indian forces—including paratroopers, naval vessels, and air support—were deployed to secure the area and assist in restoring administrative control. The operation was completed within hours and involved coordination across multiple branches of the Indian military.

== Operation Dhangu ==
The Army justified the deployment of 51 SAG (NSG) in the operation against the six terrorists at the Pathankot airbase, saying that the three service chiefs had taken the call jointly so that the elite combat force could deal with any hostage crisis in the airbase which had around 3,000 family members of IAF personnel and 23 trainees from four foreign countries at the time of the attack. Commander of the Army's Western Command Lt Gen K J Singh said the 51 SAG (NSG) was deployed as it is a force specially trained to deal with a hostage crisis. Apart from family members, 23 trainees from Afghanistan, Nigeria, Sri Lanka and Myanmar were at the airbase when terrorists struck. Singh said the strategic forward airbase of the IAF at Pathankot remained fully functional all through the 'Operation Dhangu', the codename given to the mission to eliminate the terrorists. On 3 January, when two terrorists had entered the barracks inside the airbase, six IAF personnel were stuck on the first floor of the building, Lt Gen Singh said. The commandos rappelled down to the building roof, broke the window on the first floor and evacuated IAF men. Thereafter the building was demolished with the help of IEDs to neutralise the terrorists.

== Other Operations ==
Though it is not possible to narrate all the operations carried out by NSG but the summary of important surgical operations carried out by NSG (51 SAG) are given below:

- Operation Mouse Trap – Commandos were deployed in District Taran Taaran (Punjab). More than 25 militants were killed and a large number of weapons & ammunition were recovered.
- Operation Agni Baan – Punjab terrorists were holed up inside a house in Baroda. 2 terrorists were killed and their weapons recovered.
- Operation Ghost Buster – 51 SAG was deployed with SIT for search and strike missions after the assassination of Rajiv Gandhi.
- Operation Sudarshan – 51 SAG was deployed at Ayodhya during Demolition of the Babri Masjid
- Operation Winter Storm – 51 SAG along with supporting elements were moved on 27 Oct 93 to Srinagar to flush out militants from Hazratbal Shrine. Operations were called off after a prolonged siege of almost a month though the final preparations for assault had been made.
- Operation Vajrashakti in Akshardham Temple – 51 SAG was flown to rescue hostages held by terrorist in Akshardham Temple Gandhinagar. This was the first operation in which two commandos of 51 SAG attained martyrdom. All the militants were killed with no casualties to hostages & damage to the temple.
- Operation Trident and Cyclone – Recently held operations to flush out the terrorists and rescue hostages post multiple attacks across Mumbai. Major Sandeep Unnikrishnan & Havaldar Gajender Singh made their supreme sacrifice while combating the terrorists.

== See also ==
- Special Forces of India
- Special Frontier Force
- COBRA commandos
- Special Protection Group
