= Nalin Prabhat =

Indian police officer

Director General J&K Police
- Incumbent
- Assumed office 1 October 2024
- Preceded by: R R Swain

Director General of the National Security Guard
- In office 1 May 2024 – 15 August 2024
- Preceded by: M. A. Ganapathy
- Succeeded by: B.Srinivasan

Personal details
- Born: 14 June 1968 (age 58) Thungri Village, Manali, Himachal Pradesh, India
- Education: B.A (Honours); M.A
- Alma mater: St.Stephen's College
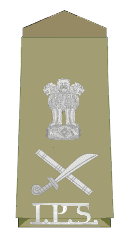
- Occupation: Director General of Police of the Jammu and Kashmir Police, former Director General of the National Security Guard
- Awards: Police Medal for Gallantry with 2nd bar (ie three times); Parakram Padak (Wound Medal); Police Medal for Distinguished Service; Police Medal for Meritorious Service; Antrik Suraksha Padak (AP); Antrik Suraksha Padak (J&K); Police (Spl Duty) Medal with Bar (J&K)

Nalin Prabhat (born 14 March 1968) is an Indian Police Service (IPS) officer of the 1992 batch of Andhra Pradesh cadre. He served as the director general of the National Security Guard from 1 May 2024 to 15 August 2024. Thereafter, he was transferred to AGMUT cadre to be appointed as director general of Jammu and Kashmir Police and took the charge on 1 October 2024.

== Early life and education ==
Nalin Prabhat was born in 1968 in the dhungri Village of Manali. He completed his B.A. (Honours) and M.A. from St. Stephen's College.

== Awards ==
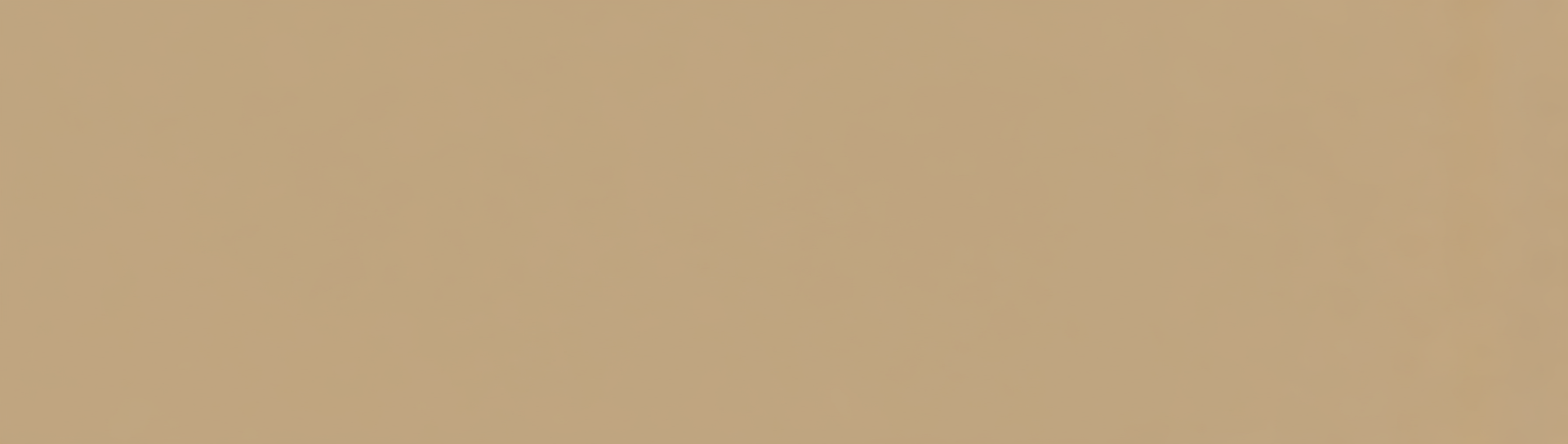
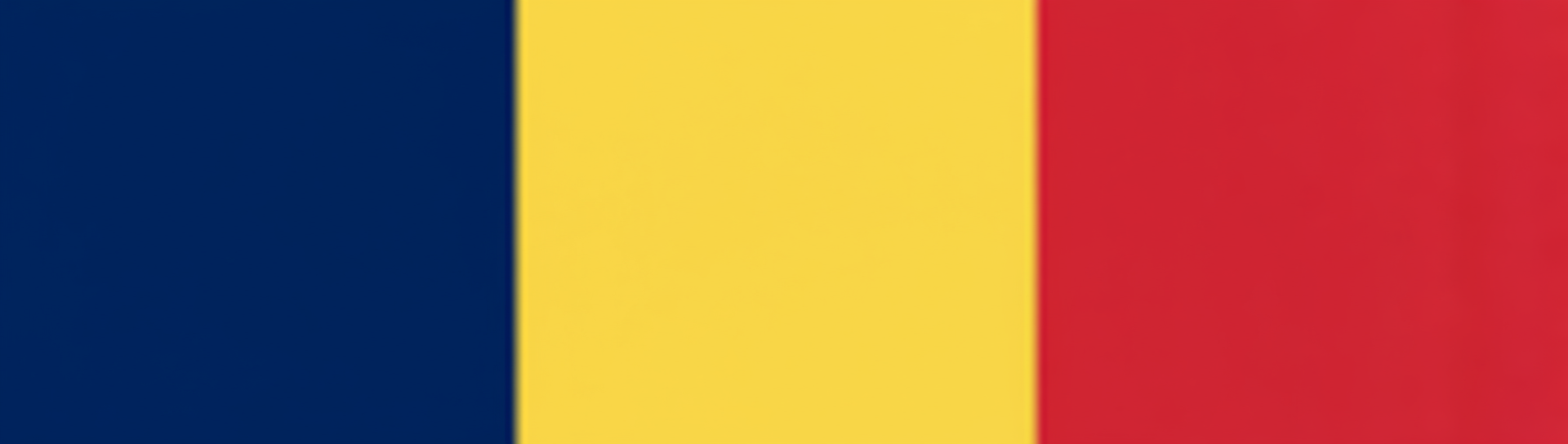

Prabhat has been awarded for his special contributions to the Indian government in his career.

- Police Medal for Gallantry with 2nd bar (ie three times)
- Parakram Padak (Wound Medal) | Police Medal for Distinguished Service
- Police Medal for Meritorious Service
- Antrik Suraksha Padak (AP)
- Antrik Suraksha Padak (J&K)
- Police (Spl Duty) Medal with Bar (J&K)
- Sainya Seva Medal with bar (i.e. two times)

== Career ==
Prabhat served many positions in the central and state government in Andhra Pradesh.
