= SSS Defence =

Indian firearms manufacturer

Stumpp Schuele & Somappa Defence
- Type: Subsidiary
- Industry: Defense
- Founded: 2017
- Headquarters: Bengaluru, India
- Products: Firearms, weapon
- Revenue: unknown
- Parent: Stumpp Schuele & Somappa Springs
- Website: sssdefence.com

Stumpp Schuele & Somappa Defence (SSS Defence) is an Indian company that deals in military small arms sectors. It is a subsidiary of Stumpp Schuele & Somappa Springs. Its current focus area is small arms, ammunition and accessories related to small arms.

== History ==
In 2016, Stumpp Schuele & Somappa Springs, the biggest Indian manufacturer of springs, started deliberating on ways to diversify its business. This led to the creation of SSS Defence. This foray into the business of small arms and ammunition was primarily targeted onto the foreign markets located in Asia, apart from those in India. It became the first private Indian firm to have developed sniper rifles when it’s Viper and Saber rifles were released.

In October 2021, the firm received an order to upgrade some of Indian army's AK-47 rifles to special operations standard. This was the first time a private Indian company received a firearms order.

In July 2024, the company secured the first export contract to a friendly foreign nation, though how many Saber sniper rifles were ordered remains unknown. The company also received the contract of ammunition from several countries. The sum of these deals is around $50 million.

In March 2025, SSS Defence won a contract to provide the Manohar M72 carbine to the Uttar Pradesh Police with 2,000 M72s. In the same month, the company unveiled a submachine gun chambered in 9mm Parabellum and a DMR. In August 2025, the company released the Raptor, which is an assault rifle chambered in .300 Blackout.

In September 2025, a friendly nation placed additional orders for the company's .338 Lapua Magnum caliber sniper weapon. Additionally, it has a $30 million contract that is now being carried out for the supply of 7.62×51mm rounds. The company won a deal in December to equip the National Security Guard with 500 units of G72 9x19 mm carbines and accessories, which is expected to cost ₹50 million.

On 21 February 2026, SSS Defence announced its "firm decision" to bid in the Project Grayburn competition. The project, which is still in concept stage, aims to replace the current service rifle family of the British Army, the SA80 series, with a new one. The next generation family will consist of five distinct variants with an order of over 2 lakh rifles. The contract period spans 17 years between 1 April 2028 and 31 March 2045.

== Products and facilities ==
=== Pistols/Handguns ===
G72 P

=== Submachine Guns ===
G72 SMG
G72 CSMG

=== Sniper rifles ===
338 Saber
308 Viper

SSS Defence has developed two sniper rifles and plans to offer them for trials to Indian special forces, being the Viper and the Saber. SSS Defence says that these rifles have been designed to be compatible with the body structures of Indian soldiers.

- Viper is a sub-MOA sniper rifle chambered for 7.62×51mm or .308 cartridges. It has a proven range of more than 1,000 metres (3,300 ft).
- Saber is a sniper rifle chambered for .338 Lapua Magnum. Its length and height can be adjusted at its butt stock. It has a range of around 1,500 metres (4,900 ft). The picatinny rail system on the rifle has a MIL-STD-1913 rail at a total of 4 positions. It has a weight of around 7 kilograms. When fully equipped with accessories, the Sabre weighs around 9 kilograms. The rifle has an ambidextrous magazine release. It can be equipped with three different types of barrels with lengths of 24, 26, and 27 inches respectively, its RH Twist being 1:11.25". The receiver system of the rifle is made up of aluminium alloy and the surface of the receiver is coated with cerakote and black oxide.
- T72 DMR/Battle Rifle

=== Assault Rifles ===
P72 AR
T72 AR
M72
M72-I
300 Raptor

The company has also developed the P-72 family of rifles, with design philosophy similar to the ACR, FN SCAR, and the CZ BREN 2.

- P-72 Rapid Engagement Combat Rifle (RECR) was designed for general infantry and special operations environments. It is chambered for 7.62×39mm or 7.62×51mm.
- P-72 Recon Carbine is a short, gas piston-operated weapon chambered for 7.62×39mm or 5.56×45mm cartridges.
- P-72 Designated Marksman Rifle (DMR) comes in both 7.62×51mm and 7.62×39mm. This provides a range of around 800 metres (2,600 ft).
- Manohar 72 (M72) carbine.

=== Precision Rifles ===
T72 DMR
T12

=== Facilities ===
SSS Defence is projected to become the second Indian company to operate a small arms manufacturing facility by the end of 2020. This facility will eventually be capable of producing 80,000 arms per year, starting with an initial 15,000 per year. By 2021, it also plans to operationalise an ammunition manufacturing in Anantapur, Andhra Pradesh.

The firm has established a joint venture with Companhia Brasileira de Cartuchos for this purpose. This facility will produce ammunition, including 12.7mm, 9mm, 7.62×51mm, 7.62×39mm and .338 Lapua Magnum.
