= HD66 =

Chinese 9 mm pistol

- Type: Weapon accessory
- Place of origin: China

Service history
- In service: 2009 - present

The HD66 is a Chinese pistol accessory which allows an operator to fire at targets around a corner without being exposed to return fire.

== History ==
The HD66 was first introduced in May 2009 at the 4th China Police Expo held in Beijing. It is co-developed by Chongqing Changfeng Machinery Co Ltd and Shanghai Sea Shield Technologies Company.

According to Qing Shanseng, chief designer of the HD-66 and CF-06, both systems are indigenous and were not done based on the CornerShot.

== Design ==
The HD66 weapon system is comparable to the better known CornerShot system.

=== Components ===
- QSZ-92 pistol
- Fire module
- Double safety part
- CCD module
- Video processing module
- Ocular displaying module
- Illuminating module
- Weapon correction system
- Radio signal transmitting/receiving module
- Supply power

=== Specifications ===
Caliber	9 mm
Speed	350 m/s
Effective range	50 m
Weight	4.8 kg
Length	800mm
Width	70mm
Height	110mm
Battery Life	2 hours

=== Comparison vs Cornershot ===
- HD 66 has an improved pistol mounting method than Cornershot’s 2 pressing plates to provide a higher shooting accuracy.
- HD 66 has a better man-machine interface
- Software weapon correction to replace mechanical aim point adjustment.
- The signal transmitting/receiving system can help to organize coordinated attack to provide a greater firepower.
- Ocular displaying scope conceal the shooter better than Cornershot’s LCD

== Similar weapons ==
=== CF06 ===
Developed and unveiled alongside the HD-66.

=== CS/LW9 ===
Developed by the China Ordnance Industry Research Institute in 2005 in an attempt to do a similar system to the Israeli-made Cornershot.

The CS/LW9 has a handle at the bottom that can be used to turn the LW9 to the left or right. Aside from the QSZ-92, the LW9 may also be fitted with the Norinco NP22/34, Chinese-produced SIG Sauer P226 and P228 pistols.

== Users ==
- China
  - Law enforcement in China
    - Beijing SWAT
    - Shanghai Police

== See also ==
- POF Eye
- CornerShot
