= PRAHAAR =

Government Counter Terrorism policy

PRAHAAR is India's national counter-terrorism policy and strategy released by the Ministry of Home Affairs on 23 February 2026. It is India's first comprehensive doctrine integrating counter-terrorism, counter-radicalization, cybersecurity, and coordinated security response mechanisms into a unified national framework.

== Background ==
During 2004 to 2014, India recorded 7217 terrorist incidents.

== Basis of the strategy ==
The strategy is based on the following factors, the first letters of which form the acronym PRAHAAR:

1. Prevention of terror attacks
2. Response to threats in a swift and proportionate manner
3. Aggregating internal capacities so that response is given with a whole of government approach
4. Human rights and rule of law based approach while responding to threats
5. Attenuation of conditions that enable terrorism and radicalisation
6. Alignment and shaping of international efforts to counter terrorism
7. Recovery and resilience through an inclusive approach that considers society as a whole

== Threat profile as per the policy document ==
The policy identifies the threats on the basis of source and type of threat. It specifically mentions cross border terrorism through Jihadi outfits and their frontal organizations and mentions global terrorist groups such as Al-Qaeda and ISIS trying to incite violence in the country through their sleeper cells. The document also states that latest technologies are being used to facilitate terror related activities in India. It also identifies criminal hackers and nation states being an area of concern as they are targeting India through cyberattacks.

The following have been identified as being used for purposes of terror:

- Drone technologies
- Organized criminal networks for logistics and recruitment
- Social media platforms and instant messaging applications for propaganda, communication, funding and guiding terror attacks
- Anonymity enabling technologies such as encryption, dark web, cryptocurrency.

The policy also identifies the challenge being faced by counter-terrorism agencies in disrupting and intercepting terrorist efforts to access and use chemical, biological, radiological, nuclear, explosive and digital materials.

== Strategy ==
=== Prevention of terror attacks ===
The policy focuses on the use of a proactive Intelligence-guided approach to enable the security agencies to neutralise threats. It would involve the use of the Multi Agency Centre (MAC) and the Joint Task Force on Intelligence (JTFI) in the Intelligence Bureau to share intelligence inputs on a real time basis across the country. The policy emphasizes on coordination between Central Agencies and State Police Forces. There is emphasis also on disrupting terror funding networks through a legal framework. The policy also highlights the Central Armed Police Forces, Defence Forces & Immigration authorities being provided with state of the art tools and technologies for the purpose of securing Indian borders.

=== Response to terror attacks ===
The local police is considered the first responder to any terror attack. They will be assisted by specialised state and central anti-terror forces. The National Security Guard also provides assistance to state forces in responding to major terror attacks as well as helping them build capacity.

There is a standard operating procedure already defined by the Ministry of Home Affairs for coordination. The investigation and prosecution is done by the National Investigation Agency and state police forces.

=== Aggregating capacities ===
The policy recognizes the need to modernize the security and law enforcement agencies. Modernization of training infrastructure, faculties and modules at the training facilities as well as acquisition of latest tools, technology and weaponry is emphasized. It highlights the work of the Bureau of Police Research and Development (BPR&D) in training of state police and CAPF personnel as well as that of NSG in training State specialized CT units for urban combat. The policy also recognizes the need to have a standardized processes and procedures for these operations.

=== Human rights and rule of law based processes ===
The policy outlines the various laws used to tackle terrorism related crimes such as:

- Unlawful Activities (Prevention) Act, 1967
- Bharatiya Nyaya Sanhita, 2023
- Bharatiya Nagarik Suraksha Sanhita, 2023
- Bharatiya Sakshya Adhiniyam, 2023
- Explosives Substance Act, 1908
- Arms Act 1959
- Prevention of Money Laundering Act, 2002

It emphasises that Indian laws have given due importance to human rights and the concept of Rule of Law. It states that India has laws such as the Protection of Human Rights Act, 1993 and India is a signatory to the Universal Declaration of Human Rights 1948 and ratifier of the International Covenant on Civil and Political Rights. The policy also highlights the multiple level redressal system available under the Indian legal system for any accused person.

=== Attenuating the conditions conducive to terrorism ===
The policy highlights the threat of terror groups making efforts to recruit Indian youth. It speaks about how the Intelligence and Law Enforcement agencies are attempting to disrupt and thwart these efforts. The main lines of action are:

- Initiation of legal action against the individual based on their level of radicalization.
- Engagement of community and religion leaders, moderate preachers and NGOs to spread awareness about the adverse consequences of radicalization and extremist violence.
- Constructive engagement of youth.
- De-radicalization programs for youth that have already become victim of radicalization.
- Sensitization of prison staff to help prevent acts of radicalization by hardcore inmates.
- Use of government schemes and initiatives to address poverty and unemployment.
- Providing access to quality education, affordable housing and stable jobs to vulnerable communities
- Empowerment of youth and women educationally and financially through scholarships and loan schemes.

=== Aligning and shaping the international efforts ===
Various agreements have been entered into with foreign partners and international community to share information and evidence. This supports the agency to agency engagements that India has for Intelligence sharing.

=== Recovery and resilience through a whole-of-society approach ===
This section identifies India's approach to countering terrorism or dealing with a terror attach.

- Civil Society: Doctors, psychologists, lawyers, NGOs, religious and community leaders are engaged by the government to sensitize and reintegrate the affected community.
- Civil Administration: Reconstruction and restoration is catered to by the civil administration.
- Police Administration: Preventive security measures are taken to reassure the community.

== The way forward ==
This section of the policy focusses on areas of improvement. Briefly stated these are:

- Further cooperation and collaboration among various agencies for intelligence collection and investigation.
- Timely amendments in the domestic counter terrorism legal regime to keep abreast of emerging challenges.
- Continuous capacity building of counter terrorism units, anti terror squads, of states and union territories.
- Uniformity in structure, resources, training and methodologies of investigation.
- Use of legal experts at every stage of investigation beginning with registration of First Information Reports (FIR) until prosecution.
