= CornerShot =

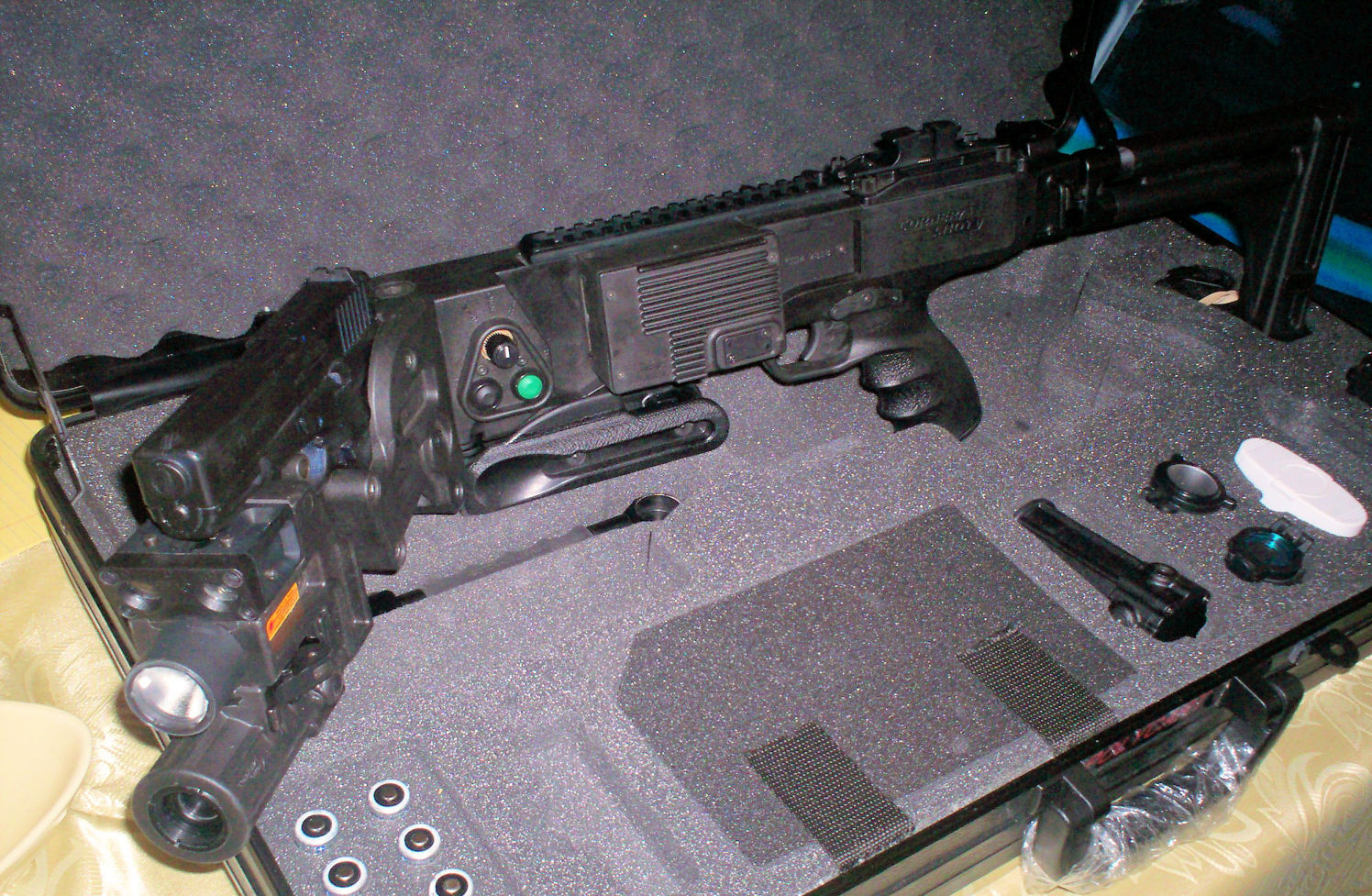
- A standard CornerShot fitted with a fake Glock pistol.
- Type: Weapon accessory
- Place of origin: Israel

Service history
- In service: 2003–present
- Used by: See Users

Production history
- Designer: Amos Golan
- Manufacturer: Corner Shot Holdings, LLC
- Produced: 2003–present
- Variants: 4 (including Standard)

Specifications
- Mass: 3.86 kilograms (8.5 lb)
- Length: 820 millimetres (32.7 in)

CornerShot is a weapon accessory created by Lt. Col. Amos Golan of the Israel Defense Forces in cooperation with American investors.

== History ==
It was designed in the early 2000s for use by SWAT teams and special forces in hostile situations usually involving terrorists and hostages.

Corner Shot Holdings, LLC was founded in Florida by two former senior officers from anti-terrorism units of the Israel Defense Forces together with US investors to produce the CornerShot.

== Purpose ==
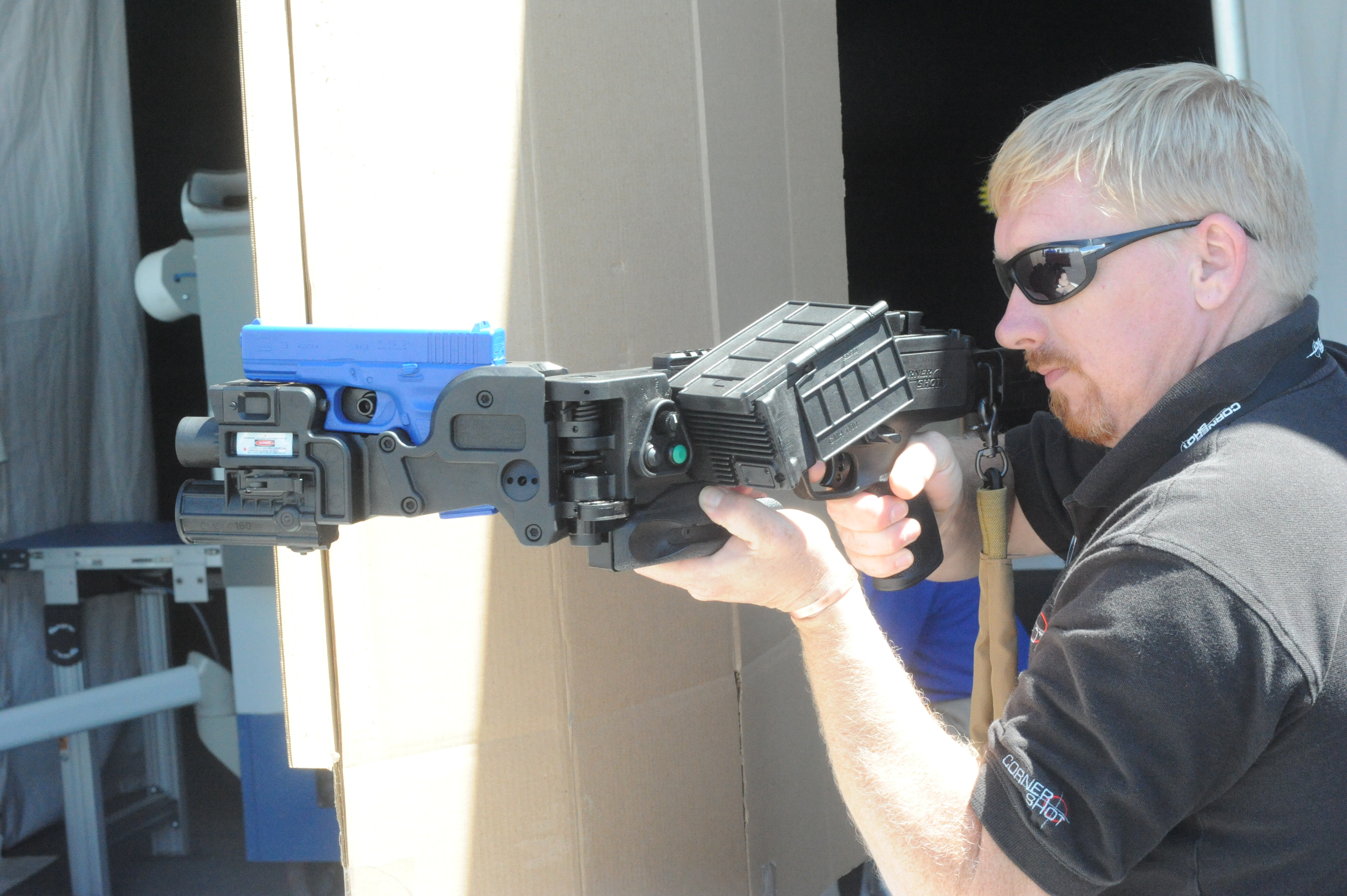
CornerShot demonstration

The CornerShot's purpose is similar to that of the periscope rifle and the curved barrel (German: Krummlauf) attachment on the Sturmgewehr 44 rifle in World War II; it allows its operator to both see and attack an armed target without exposing the operator to counterattack.

Aside from a weapon, CornerShot can also mount various accessories such as detachable cameras, audio/video transmission kits, visible and IR lasers, tactical flashlights, suppressors, and can fire rubber bullets. Because they are fitted with high-resolution digital cameras, any variant can be used as a surveillance tool.

The system can also be remotely emplaced and operated from behind camouflage, with a wire video-out connection sending images to a commander at a distance or saved to a two-hour flash memory chip attached to the gunstock.

== Design ==
=== Set-ups ===
==== Pistol ====
In the standard CornerShot, a pistol is mounted in the front end of the weapon, which bends horizontally at a mid-frame sixty-degree hinge. There is a digital camera and a flashlight attached to the barrel in the bayonet position.

On the butt side of the CornerShot hinge are the trigger, camera screen (which is on a horizontal hinge just like the mid-gun hinge but it is off of the left side of the gun), and controls for the camera and light.

The standard pistol version may fit various models, including but are not limited to the Beretta 92F, Glock, SIG Sauer, and CZ pistols, in 9×19mm, .40 S&W, .45 ACP and 5.7×28mm calibres.

==== Assault Pistol Rifle ====
The Assault Pistol Rifle (APR) mounts a custom pistol in the front part of the weapon to allow the use of 5.56 mm ammunition. The APR pistol can be removed from the CornerShot frame.

==== Others ====
Aside a 40 mm grenade launcher, future versions will be mountable on the US M16 rifle and a European joint assault weapon.

=== Accessories ===
All the models come with the same stock camera and 2.5-inch color LCD monitor, providing a video observation and sighting system with powerful transmission capability. The flashlight and camera let it operate in either day or night. A variety of optional interchangeable cameras, as well as a folding stock, are available, and a universal accessory rail is standard.

== Foreign variants ==
=== China ===
China has made at least three CornerShot-like weapons to date: the HD-66, the CF-06 and the CS/LW9.

=== Pakistan ===
POF Eye is a special-purpose CornerShot weapon system. It was first revealed at the 5th International Defence Exhibition and Seminar (IDEAS 2008), held at the Karachi Expo Centre in November 2008. It is designed for SWAT and special forces teams in hostile situations, particularly counter-terrorism and hostage rescue operations.

The POF Eye is in service with Pakistani security forces since 2014 with newer variants in service as well.

=== Iran ===
Iran has demonstrated a weapon that is a clone of the Israeli CornerShot.

As of 2016, there is no information on whether the Iranian military has fielded it.

=== South Korea ===
==== Korea Special-Purpose Weapon ====
South Korea had publicly unveiled their own version of the CornerShot on March 23, 2010, created and developed by the Agency for Defense Development. The ADD had ₩350 million invested for research and development of their own CornerShot in September 2008 to 2015 Its functions are similar to the original version, with the exception of a laser target designator and a pixel sensor included to assist in locating hostile targets.

The CornerShot made in South Korea was developed by S&T Daewoo. It's unveiled in 2016 as the Korea Special-Purpose Weapon and mounts a S&T Daewoo K5 pistol, although it can be used with other sidearms. The K1A can be attached to the KSPW if necessary for additional firepower.

The KPSW has MIL-STD-1913 rails to allow attachment of optics and other tactical accessories.

=== India ===
==== Trikaal ====
An Indian-made Cornershot weapon was first reported to be in development in 2014. A cornershot weapon system (CSWS) is designed by the Armament Research and Development Establishment (ARDE) and developed by the Defence Research and Development Organisation (DRDO). The CSWS is planned to have a pistol and 40mm GL variant. Development was reportedly done by 2019.

It is made in aluminum alloy to make it light and durable. The CSWS's camera, laser, infrared illuminator, and torch are positioned in the front while the display, electronics, battery, and swivelling mechanism are located in the back. It can be equipped with the Glock 17/19 and the Indian-made 1A pistol. The DRDO version is being made in collaboration with Zen Technologies. On February 5, 2024, the Trikaal was publicly unveiled at the World Defence Show (WDS) 2024 convention in Saudi Arabia.

On March 26, 2022, the Central Reserve Police Force and the Jammu and Kashmir Police are in the process of adopting it after putting the CSWS through multiple tests. On May 9, 2025, it's reported that the J&K Police will adopt the Trikaal with 100 systems being delivered with the National Security Guard planning to procure it.

==== ShootEdge ====
Zen Technologies unveiled the ShootEdge at India International Security Expo 2015, New Delhi.

On March 29, 2022, the J&K Police awarded a contract to Zen Technologies for the ShootEdge.

== Users ==
- Azerbaijan
- India
  - Delhi Police
  - Punjab Police
- Israel
  - Shayetet 13
- Mexico
  - Special Forces Corps (CFE)
- Myanmar
  - Unknown number of Cornershots sold
- North Macedonia
  - Special Tasks Unit "Tiger"
- Pakistan
  - Pakistan Armed Forces
    - Special Service Group
  - Law enforcement in Pakistan
- Russia
- South Korea
  - ROK Army
    - Special Forces
- Turkey
  - Special Forces
  - Gendarmerie Special Operations Command
  - Police Special Operation Department
- Vietnam
  - Special Police Force (Vietnamese: Cảnh sát Cơ động)
  - Vietnamese Army
    - 113th Special Forces Brigade

== See also ==
- Weapons
