= Ranjit Shekhar Mooshahary =

Indian politician

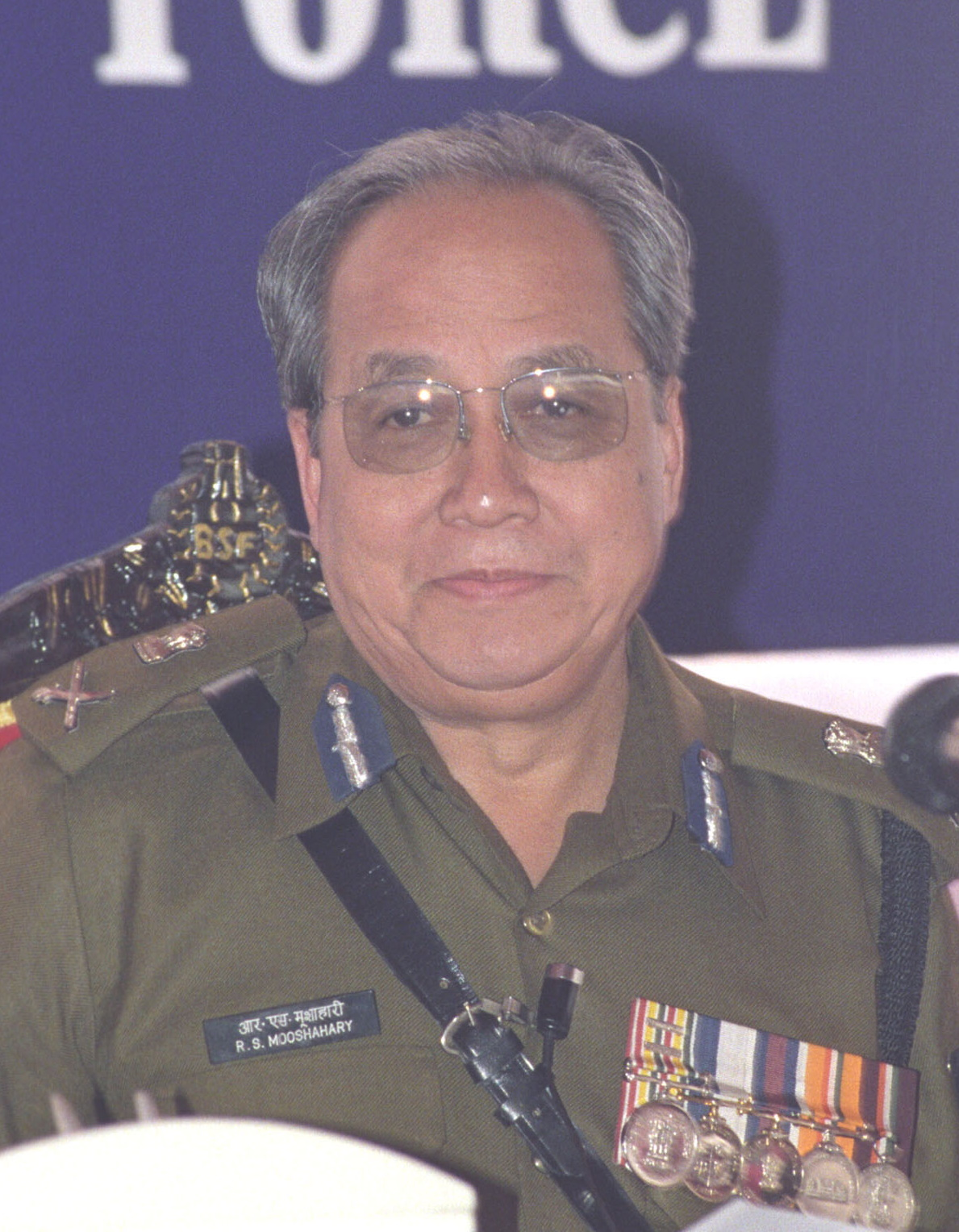
- R.S. Mooshahary in November 2005

Governor of Meghalaya
- In office 1 July 2008 – 6 July 2013
- Preceded by: Shivinder Singh Sidhu
- Succeeded by: Krishan Kant Paul

Personal details
- Born: 1946 (age 79–80) Odlaguri, Gossaigaon, Kokrajhar district, Assam, British Raj

Ranjit Shekhar Mooshahary (born 1947) is an Indian politician who was the Governor of Meghalaya, a state in northeast India, from 2008 to 2013 (1 July 2008 to 6 July 2013). Previously he was an IPS officer, director-general of National Security Guards (NSG) and the Border Security Force (BSF).

== Early life and education ==
Mooshahary hails from the Bodo community. He was born in the village Odlaguri near Gossiagaon subdivision in Kokrajhar district, now under the Bodoland Territorial Areas Districts, of Assam. He completed his pre-university study in Union Christian College, Umiam and then graduated from St Anthonys College, Shillong with honours in Political Science.

== Career ==
Mooshahary became an IPS officer of the 1967 batch and was allotted the Kerala cadre. He worked on important assignments in Kerala and early on in his career in 1981-82 was commissioner of police of the city of Cochin. Later he held the offices of Inspector General of Police and chief of Crime Branch CID and lastly Director general of the Vigilance and Anti-Corruption Bureau.

Apart from Kerala, Mooshahary has occupied several distinguished posts. He was in the Cabinet Secretariat and had served in the state of Assam, including at a later point in his career in this province's police force. He served in the federal Central Reserve Police Force as Deputy Inspector general and Inspector General during the late eighties and early nineties during which period he served in the states of Tamil Nadu, Jammu and Kashmir and Rajasthan. He was appointed Director General of the elite National Security Guards (NSG) in February 2002.

He headed the NSG for nearly three years before being shifted as Director General of the BSF, one of the largest standing paramilitary border guarding forces in the world, in 2005. He was the first IPS officer from northeast India to be appointed the Director-General of the BSF, a position he held till his retirement from active service in February 2006. Mooshahary was awarded the Police Medal for Meritorious Service and the President's Police Medal for Distinguished Service. He has also served in the CRPF, besides the state police force of Assam and has done a commendable job in combating terrorism, and contributing to the security of the Republic of India.

In March 2006, Mooshahary was appointed by the Governor of Assam as the first Chief Information Commissioner of the State under the Right to Information Act. He was instrumental in operationalising the legislation and setting in motion the legal processes of redressal mandated therein and held this position up to his elevation to Governorship of Meghalaya State by the President of India for a 5-year term in 2008.

== See also ==
- Government of Meghalaya
- Governors of Meghalaya
