= National Security Guard =

Indian counterterrorism force

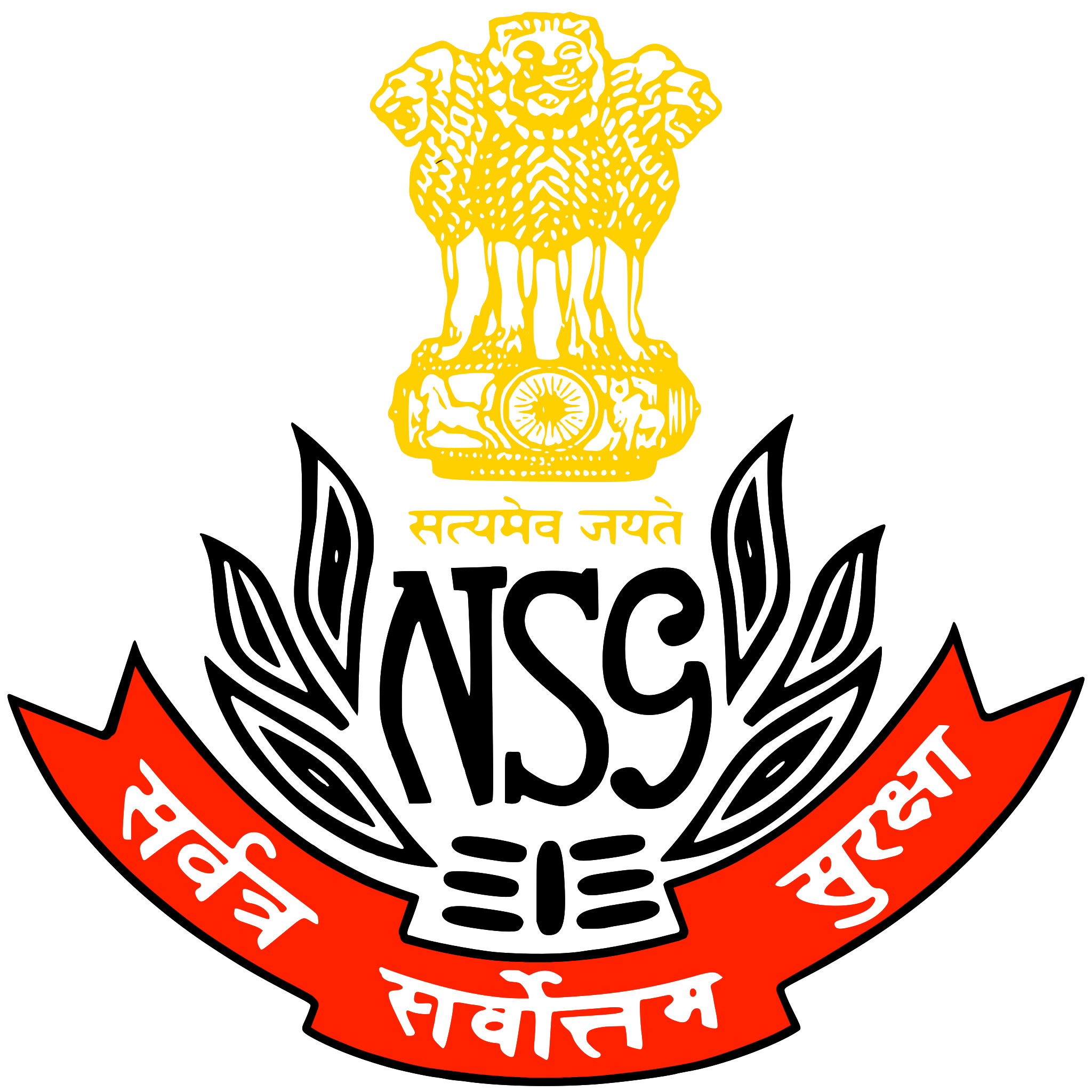
- Emblem of the National Security Guard

- Flag of the National Security Guard
- Common name: "Black Cats"
- Abbreviation: NSG
- Motto: "सर्वत्र सर्वोत्तम सुरक्षा"; Sarvatra Sarvottama Suraksha; Best Security Everywhere

Agency overview
- Formed: 16 October 1984; 42 years ago
- Employees: 10,000 active personnel
- Annual budget: ₹1,422.47 crore (US$152.0 million) (2026-27)

Jurisdictional structure
- Legal jurisdiction: Republic of India
- Governing body: Ministry of Home Affairs, Government of India
- Constituting instrument: National Security Guard Act, 1986

Operational structure
- Headquarters: New Delhi
- Minister responsible: Amit Shah, Minister of Home Affairs
- Agency executive: B. Srinivasan, IPS, Director General
- Parent agency: Ministry of Home Affairs
- Regional Hubs: Chennai; Gandhinagar; Hyderabad; Kolkata; Mumbai

Notables
- Significant Operations: Black Thunder; Ashwamedh; Insurgency in Jammu and Kashmir; Vajra Shakti; Black Tornado; Insurgency in Northeast India

Website
- https://nsg.mha.gov.in/

The National Security Guard (NSG) is a central armed police force in India under the Ministry of Home Affairs. It is the nodal National Counter-Terror Force for the Government of India.

It was founded on 16 October 1984, following Operation Blue Star, to combat terrorist activities and protect states against internal disturbances.

The formation of the NSG was formalised in the Parliament of India under the National Security Guard Act, 1986. Personnel in the National Security Guard are drawn on deputation from the Indian Army and various Central Armed Police Forces

== History ==
R.N. Kao, former Secretary of the R&AW created the National Security Guard (NSG), during the Punjab militancy during the 1980s, to address the needs of the Government of India to counteract terrorism within the country.

The NSG was established in the wake of 1984 Operation Blue Star, and the high collateral damage to Golden Temple, along with civilian and military casualties. Since its founding, the NSG has been deployed in Punjab in 1986 and Jammu and Kashmir. On 29–30 April 1986, about 300 NSG commandos and 700 Border Security Force troops stormed the Golden Temple in Operation Black Thunder I. The temple was cleared and handed over to the Punjab Police on 1 May 1986; around 300 Khalistani militants were captured and there were no deaths or injuries on either side.

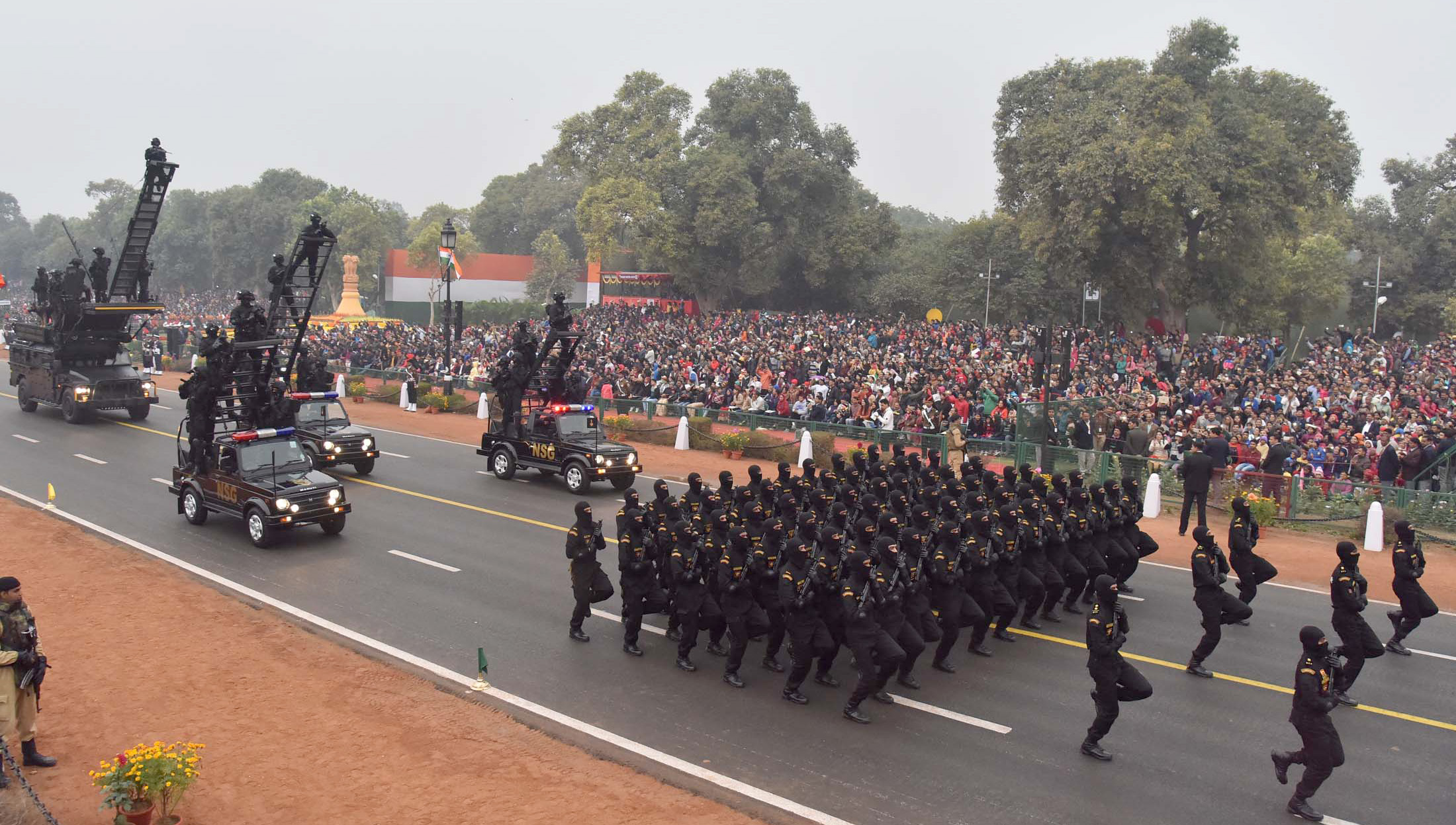
The National Security Guard (NSG) Marching Contingent passes through the Rajpath, on the occasion of the 68th Republic Day Parade 2017, in New Delhi on January 26, 2017.

In January 1988, the NSG conducted Operation Black Hawk, a heliborne operation in the Mand area of Punjab. During the operation, two terrorists were killed and one 7.62 mm rifle was recovered. According to former NSG Director-General Ved Marwah, it was a massive operation, although it did not achieve results as spectacular as those of Black Thunder.

On 12 May 1988, around 1,000 NSG commandos surrounded the Golden Temple for another assault as part of Operation Black Thunder II. Sniper teams armed with Heckler & Koch PSG-1 rifles with night scopes took up positions, including atop a 300-foot water tower. Commandos from the 51 SAG were divided into assault squadrons, while the SRG sealed off the area around the temple and provided tactical support. During the three-day operation between 15 and 18 May 1988, the NSG cleared the temple; 40 terrorists were killed and around 200 surrendered. In the mid-1990s, an NSG battalion was again deployed in Punjab to confront Khalistani militants, and during this period they also began training the Punjab Police in counter-terrorism operations.

From 5 September to 15 January 1988, the NSG was involved in guarding a high-risk terrorist code-named "Jack". On 4 August 1989, the force conducted Operation Mouse Trap in the Tarn Taran district of Punjab in conjunction with Punjab Police and other security forces. The operation demonstrated that area dominance at night could be achieved if the strategy and tactics were appropriate; Ved Marwah referred to this as Operation Night Dominance. On 10 November 1990, an NSG task force flew to Kolkata to rescue hostages of a Thai Airbus hijacked by Burmese students.

On 25–26 January 1991, the NSG conducted Operation Ani Ben during counter-insurgency tasks in Baroda, Gujarat, where Punjab terrorists were holed up inside a house. Two terrorists were killed and two AK-47 rifles were recovered. Between 1 July and 20 September 1991, the NSG was employed along with the SIT in search-and-strike missions following the assassination of Rajiv Gandhi. From 25 November to 16 December 1992, about 150 commandos were deployed at Ayodhya during the Ram Janmabhoomi–Babri Masjid crisis.

On 27 March 1993, 52 SAG was mobilised and moved to Adampur to rescue hostages of Indian Airlines Flight IC 486. On 24–25 April 1993, NSG commandos stormed a hijacked Indian Airlines Boeing 737 carrying 141 passengers at Amritsar airport during Operation Ashwamedh. Two hijackers, including their leader Mohammed Yousuf Shah, were killed and another was disarmed before any hostages were harmed.

In October 1998, following a decision by the Union Home Ministry to conduct proactive strikes against militants, commando teams supported by IAF Mi-25/35 helicopter gunships began operations against militant groups deep inside the mountains and forests of Kashmir. After helicopter reconnaissance to locate the militants, commandos comprising NSG and Rashtriya Rifles personnel were para-dropped into the area along with supplies to hunt them. They relied on these supplies and their ability to live off the land until replenishment every fortnight or so; these missions are possibly ongoing.

On 15 July 1999, NSG commandos ended a 30-hour standoff in Jammu and Kashmir by killing two terrorists and rescuing all 12 hostages unharmed. The terrorists had earlier attacked a BSF campus near Srinagar, killing three officers and the wife of another, and had kept the hostages locked in a room. On 21 August 1999, after interrogation of three captured terrorists, the Delhi Police Crime Branch confirmed that two more militants were hiding in a single-storey house in Rudrapur, Uttar Pradesh. As they were considered armed and dangerous, the Delhi Police sought assistance from the NSG. A 16-member team arrived at the house at 4:45 a.m. and began the assault at 5:30 a.m., before first light. The first militant attempted to fire at the commandos with a pistol kept by his bedside but was killed instantly. The second terrorist was shot before he could fire and died about 40 minutes later; no NSG personnel were injured.

In December 1999, terrorists hijacked Indian Airlines flight IC814 from Nepal and forced it to land in Amritsar, Punjab. The Crisis Management Group (CMG), which authorised the use of the NSG, was informed within minutes of the landing, but delays meant that the aircraft departed before the NSG could intervene. The aircraft eventually landed in Kandahar, Afghanistan, where one hostage was killed. The Indian government later agreed to the hijackers' demands to release three jailed terrorists, after which the hostages were freed and the hijackers escaped to Pakistan.

In February 2000, following the IC 814 incident, the Indian government decided to implement an air-marshalling programme in which at least two NSG operators would be present on selected flight routes. These operators would carry weapons firing lethal but low-velocity fragmentation rounds designed to minimise risk to passengers and prevent penetration of the aircraft fuselage. Another measure was the permanent deployment of NSG teams at eight sensitive airports across the country, particularly those near Pakistan and in the North East, to reduce response times in case of hijacking. It is unclear whether the plan was fully implemented.

In September 2002, SAG commandos flew to Karnataka to capture forest brigand and sandalwood smuggler Veerappan following the kidnapping of former state minister Nagappa. They withdrew after determining that the intelligence available for the operation was inadequate, though a small team remained behind to assist. The hostage was eventually killed in December 2002.

In October 2002, two terrorists attacked the Akshardham temple complex in Gujarat. NSG commandos were flown in, though their deployment was delayed by traffic in Delhi. During the assault operations, one commando was killed and another was seriously injured; the latter later died after spending 18 months in a coma. By the following morning, the terrorists had been neutralised and the operation was successfully completed.

In December 2002, terrorists attacked the Raghunath temple in Jammu. Although the NSG was prepared to be deployed to the site, the unit was recalled at the last minute.

During the 2008 Mumbai attacks, the NSG conducted Operation Black Tornado and Operation Cyclone to flush out terrorists and rescue hostages following coordinated attacks across Mumbai, India. Major Sandeep Unnikrishnan and Havaldar Gajendra Singh Bisht of the NSG's 51 Special Action Group were killed in action during the operations. More than 900 rooms were searched, eight terrorists were killed, and over 600 hostages were rescued during the operation.

Following the 2013 Hyderabad blasts, the NSG was deployed in Hyderabad to assist security forces and carry out investigations. The force was also deployed in Bangalore after the 2013 Bangalore Bomb Blast occurred in the city. After the 2013 Patna bombings, an NSG team sent to Patna for post-blast analysis reported that at least three additional Improvised Explosive Devices (IEDs) were defused.

During the 2016 Pathankot attack, NSG commandos participated in operations to neutralise the terrorists. Lieutenant Colonel Niranjan Kumar of the NSG was killed while attempting to defuse a grenade or IED booby-trapped on the body of a dead terrorist, and 12 other members of the unit were injured. In the joint operation conducted by the NSG, Defence Security Corps, and the Garud Commando Force, six terrorists were neutralised.

In May 2023, a team of NSG commandos was deployed in Srinagar, Jammu and Kashmir, along with a team of MARCOS commandos to provide security for delegates attending the third G20 Tourism Working Group Meeting held at the Sher-i-Kashmir International Convention Centre on the banks of Dal Lake in Srinagar from 22 to 24 May.

== Organisation ==
External videos
- Inside NSG, a 2023 documentary film by National Geographic

The organisation benchmarked its structure against elite counterterrorism units such as Britain's Special Air Service (SAS) and Germany's GSG 9.

Mehram Nagar, Palam, serves as the administrative headquarters for the NSG. The headquarters is overseen by the Director-General of the NSG, who is assisted in administrative matters by four Indian Police Service officers, out of whom two are Inspectors General at the Administrative Headquarters. In turn, they are assisted by the Deputy Inspectors General of the NSG. The Financial Advisor of the NSG is generally an officer with the rank of Joint Secretary belonging to the Central Accounts Services and is assisted by two Deputy Financial Advisors belonging of the Indian Audit and Accounts Service and the Indian Civil Accounts Service respectively. A small unit of the NSG is present near Palam Nagar.

Manesar is the operational headquarters of the NSG. An Indian Army Major general who is deputed to NSG Manesar headquarters is designated as the Inspector General of NSG's operations. The Inspector General is responsible for planning and conducting operations. Training is overseen by the Inspector General of Training, also a major general on deputation from the army. Both of them are further assisted by the Deputy Inspector General of Operations and the Deputy Inspector General of Training respectively. The combat arms of the NSG consist of two Special Action Groups and three Special Ranger Groups stationed at its Manesar headquarters, five Special Composite Groups posted at each of its five regional hubs as well as the National Bomb Data Centre and the Electronic Support Centre also based at its operational headquarters in Manesar.

== Personnel ==
The NSG consists entirely of volunteers on deputation from the Central Armed Police Forces, or the State Police departments and the Indian Army. NSG commandos are sent back to their parent department after serving with the force for a certain period. The Director General of the National Security Guard is an officer who is appointed from the Indian Police Service. Since 2012, women at the Central Armed Police Forces have been serving in the NSG.

=== Ranks ===
Officers

Rank group	General / flag officers				Senior officers			Junior officers
National Security Guard
National Security Guard	Director general -	Additional director general -	Inspector general -	Deputy inspector general -	Group commander -	Second in command -	Squadron commander -	Team commander -

Personnel

Rank group	Subordinate Officers (SO)				Non commissioned officers (NCO)		Enlisted
National Security Guard							No insignia
National Security Guard	Subedar major सूबेदार मेजर	Assistant commander-1 -	Assistant commander-2 -	Assistant commander-3 -	Ranger grade I -	Ranger grade II -	Combatised tradesmen -

== Selection and training ==
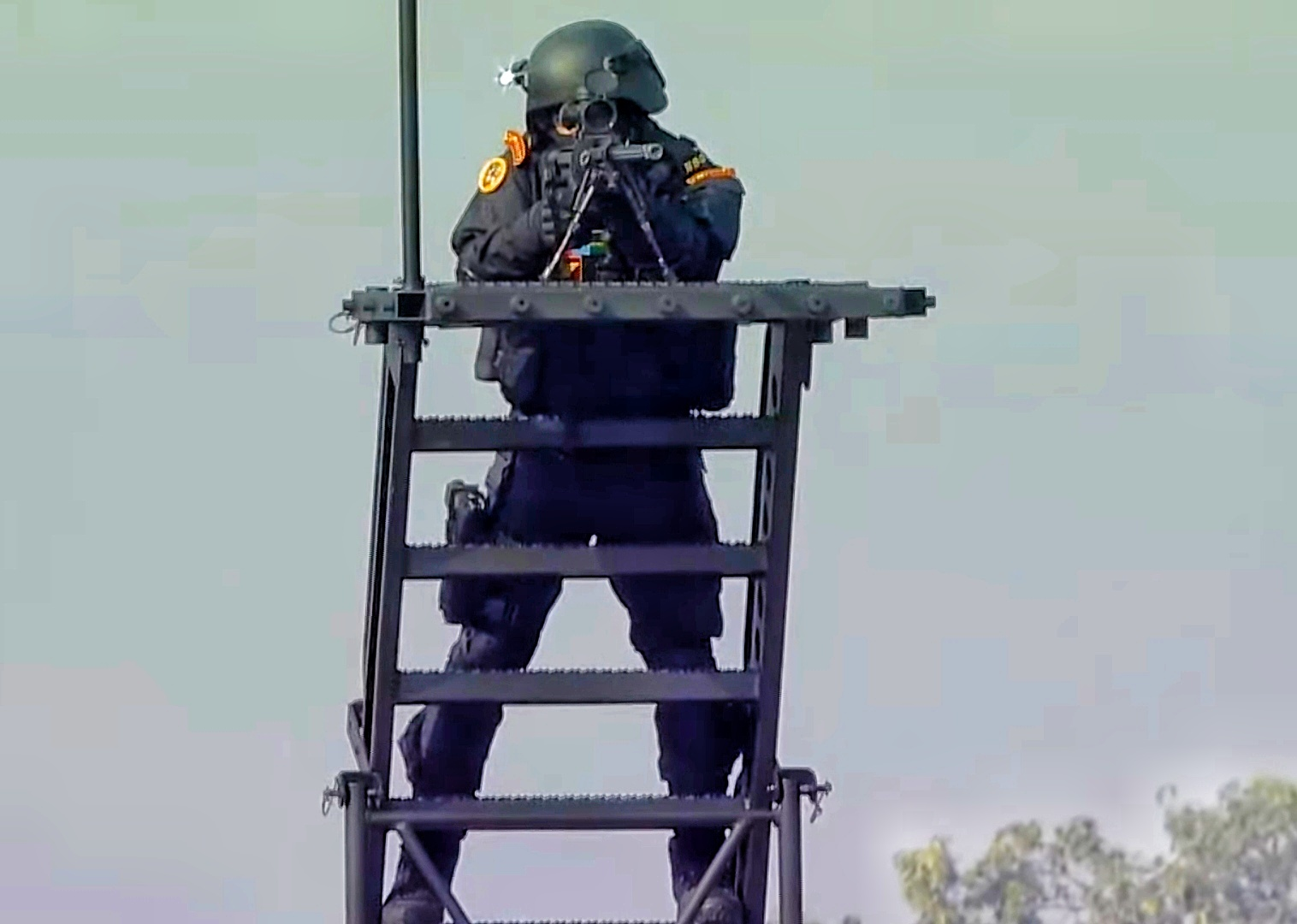
NSG Sniper with a Barrett Model 98B during Republic Day parade in 2021

Selection is highly demanding and has a drop-out rate of about 70–80 per cent. The NSG has a 14-month-long training course, which spans three phases. The eligibility of trainees is assessed in the selection stage, which consists of various tests related to the physical and psychological capabilities of the trainees. A cadet has to meet certain educational, physical, and psychological criteria to clear this stage. The second stage is selection and basic training, which is conducted at the National Security Guard Academy in Manesar, lasts for three months, and is devoted to the basics. The physical fitness training has 26 elements, ranging from a cross-country obstacle course to jumping from heights and across divides and scaling different kinds of terrain. One endurance test involves martial arts, target shooting at the end of an obstacle-ridden cross-country run. Such exercises are supposedly meant to assess how the candidate would likely perform under stress and exhaustion. Those who complete the tests are sent for nine months of advanced training.

Advanced training reportedly includes techniques related to hand-to-hand combat, intelligence gathering, demolition, bomb disposal, insertion, and reflex shooting. Well-publicised training exercises include the 'combat room shoot' where the candidates have to shoot at a target three seconds after entering a dark room with the help of a torchlight or a compatible laser image intensifier and 'twin room shooting' where candidates enter contiguous rooms and watch each other's movements on a screen which they have to shoot at to train their response time. Another known exercise requiring candidates to shoot at a target placed next to their buddy is also a part of the Indian Army Special Forces training. Shooting skills are practised at a 400-meter, 11-zone electronic combat shooting range where candidates are rated on a point scale for covering the distance in 6.30 minutes and firing at 29 different dynamic targets with the target exposure time lying between two and three minutes. Aspirants should undergo a rigorous psychological test, before being inducted into the NSG.

== Roles ==
The NSG is a 'contingency deployment force' which generally intervenes during serious terrorist attacks. It has been described as "New Delhi's go-to response force in worst case scenarios". As a specialised counter-terrorism force, it is intended to be used "only in exceptional situations" and is not meant to take over the functions of the State Police Forces or other Central Armed Police Forces.

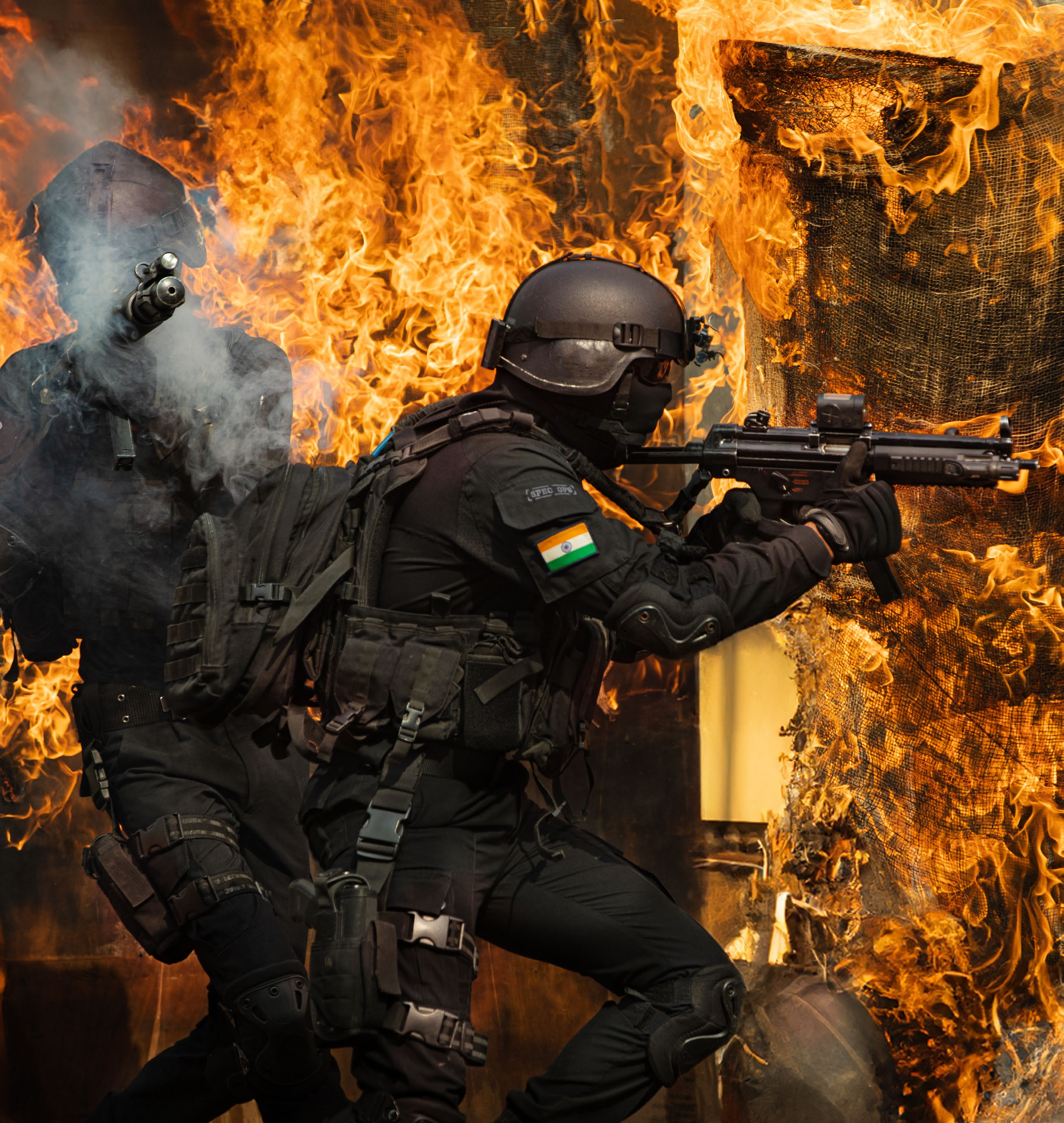
NSG Special Action Group during training

A small unit of the NSG has been present in Kashmir since 2018, when the proposal to deploy around a hundred commandos to support the Indian forces during high risk operations which was approved by the Ministry of Home Affairs. The NBDC, which is a specialised agency operating within the NSG, has also occasionally supported local law enforcement by conducting Post Blast Investigations.

=== Special Action Group (SAG) ===
The NSG has two Special Action Group – the 51 Special Action Group and the 52 Special Action Group. The 51 SAG was the first unit to be set up when the NSG was created in 1986. The 51 SAG is tasked with counterterrorism and counter insurgency operations while the 52 SAG deals with anti-hijacking operations and is also known as "Hijack Busters". The smallest operational unit within a Special Action Group is called a hit and consists of 5 members: two pairs (partners) and a technical support member. Four hits make a team that is led by a "Team Commander". SAG personnel are drawn from the Indian Army. The 51 SAG used to be the primary combat arm of the NSG, with the SRGs serving in support roles until the 2010s, when the 52 SAG was formed, and the 11 SRG, along with the 51 SAG, was made a part of the counter-terrorism force (CTF).

=== Special Ranger Groups (SRG) ===
NSG has three Special Ranger Groups (SRG) – 11, 12 & 13. Special Ranger Groups are organised into battalion lines. The SRG was initially the logistic arm of the NSG, which performed low-risk combat roles such as cordons. Later, they were being used almost exclusively for VIP security. In 2012, the role of the 11 SRG was elevated to that of SAG units, and the 11 SRG was made a part of the counter-terrorism force (CTF), which included the 51 SAG and 11 SRG. However, the other two SRGs continued to be used for VIP security purposes until October 2024, when the central government decided to withdraw them from VVIP protection duties. SRG members are drawn mainly from the Central Armed Police Force personnel.

=== Special Composite Group (SCG) ===
Special Composite Groups are stationed at the regional hubs of the National Security Guard. Special Composite Group units consisting of personnel from both the Indian Army and the Central Armed Police Forces, and respond to incidents that happen near their hubs. Each SCG is headed by an officer with the rank of Colonel on deputation from the Indian Army who serves with the rank of 'Group Commander'. The five SCG units are:

- 26 SCG Mumbai
- 27 SCG Chennai
- 28 SCG Hyderabad
- 29 SCG Kolkata
- 30 SCG Gandhinagar

=== Electronic Support Group (ESG) ===
The electronic support group is based at the NSG's headquarters at Manesar. It provides communicational and technological assistance to support the operations of the NSG. The group is headed by an officer with the rank of "Group Commander" serving on deputation from the Indian Army.

=== National Bomb Data Centre (NBDC) ===
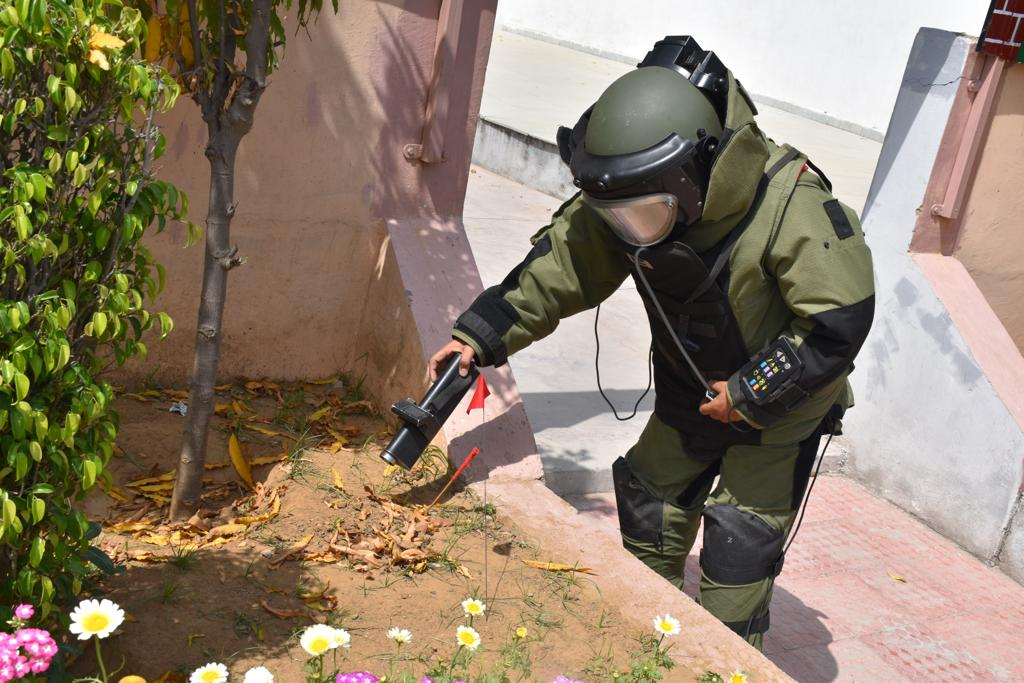
An NSG bomb disposal squad member during a training mission

The National Bomb Data Centre (NBDC) was established in the year 1988 and redefined its role in the year 2000. NBDC was assigned the role of monitoring, recording, and analysing all bombing incidents in the country. It also records and analyses various bombing incidents across the world to gain expert knowledge in bombing and related incidents to effectively counter such situations and share information with relevant security agencies. NBDC also performs research and development in the field of explosives engineering. The NBDC acts as a nodal agency for all bombing related facets in the country. It is headed by a Group Commander who is either an Army officer with the rank of 'colonel' or a Central Armed Police Force officer belonging to any force apart from the NSG itself with the rank of 'Commandant'.

=== Regional deployment ===
In response to the criticism received by the force for its failure to quickly arrive in Mumbai during the 2008 Mumbai attacks, from its base in Manesar, Haryana, the Ministry of Home Affairs decided to deploy NSG contingents in major regions all over India in order to avoid the occurrence of such situations in the future. Each hub of the NSG is headed by a highest ranking official known as the Director General of the Hub.

==== New Delhi ====
The regional hub in New Delhi is designated for Web Information Management.

==== Mumbai ====
The Mumbai regional hub is spread across 20.28 acres and has been constructed for Rs. 56.10 crore by the National Building Construction Corporation Limited. It has accommodation for the families of the commandos as well. Approximately 241 commandos will be housed there.

==== Hyderabad ====
Hyderabad is the regional hub of the National Security Guard for the region of South India. Its training centre is located near Hyderabad, Telangana, India. With the Ministry of Home Affairs (MHA) giving its nod and sanctioning ₹534 crore (equivalent to ₹817 crore or US$87 million in 2026) in 2017, the Southern Regional Centre (SRC) was established at Ibrahimpatnam, Hyderabad for training commandos. The hub land area is 81 hectares (200 acres) and constructed at a cost of ₹157 crore (US$17 million).

The Hyderabad hub of the 28 Special Composite Group (SCG) of the NSG is among the five regional hubs in the country. By 2018, 300 commandos were stationed at the NSG hub at Trimulgherry. The state has two trained anti-terror striking forces. Besides the NSG, the Telangana Police's counter-terrorist group, OCTOPUS, also has a training facility in the same neighbourhood at Ibrahimpatnam, which has a strength of over 250 personnel. NSG and OCTOPUS personnel undergo a grueling training process. The commandos are sent back to their parent department when they reach the age of 35, ensuring that the force remains young and physically fit for combat operations.

==== Chennai ====
NSG Chennai Hub was established in 2009 as the third regional hub. Till 2012, the commandos were temporarily stationed at Ashok Nagar when the permanent facility was inaugurated by India's then-home minister P.Chidambaram, with the training centre lying between forests and hillocks at Nedungundram off the Vandalur-Kelambakkam Road.

==== Kolkata ====
Kolkata became the regional hub of the NSG for the region of East India in 2009, becoming the 4th such hub in the country. The Salt Lake campus was supposed to serve as its main base until the construction of its planned permanent facility at Badu in Madhyamgram (North 24 Parganas) was fully completed. In 2012, the permanent facility was inaugurated by India's then Home Minister P. Chidambaram. The NSG hub in Kolkata had about 241 commandos by then, but the regional hub was still incomplete. On 1 March 2020, the fully completed 29 Special Composite Group complex was inaugurated by the Home Minister Amit Shah at New Town, West Bengal.

==== Gandhinagar ====
In July 2018, NSG operationalised its fifth regional hub at Gandhinagar in Gujarat. The hub stands on 1.33 lakh sq m of land and contains training facilities, barracks, and logistical support for 100 NSG commandos

==== Future ====
NSG has proposed Amritsar as a regional hub to improve its counteraction capabilities in Northern India. NSG has considered other cities or regions like Ayodhya, Pathankot, and Kerala. In July 2024, an NSG team reached Ayodhya to carry out a 4-day exercise with coordination from other CAPF units and assess the security structure of the city. The NSG hub in Ayodhya is equipped with specialised weaponry and anti-drone technology that is expected to be operationalised along with support units of other CAPFs within a few months. The land allocation process for the hub has begun. The Ayodhya hub will be the first response centre for NSG in Uttar Pradesh. After the establishment of these three hubs by 2024-end, there will be a total of eight NSG hubs in India.

=== Joint Training Exercises ===
The NSG frequently participates in training exercises. The majority of them are with the U.S. Army's Green Berets who regularly participate in training exercises with the NSG. The two forces conduct an annual counterterrorism training exercise called TARKASH.

=== Germany ===
After the 2008 Mumbai attacks, the NSG decided to have a joint exercise with the German GSG 9. In November 2009, a team from NSG visited the GSG 9 headquarters. Joint training exercises between GSG 9 and NSG were subsequently conducted in Manesar.

=== United States ===
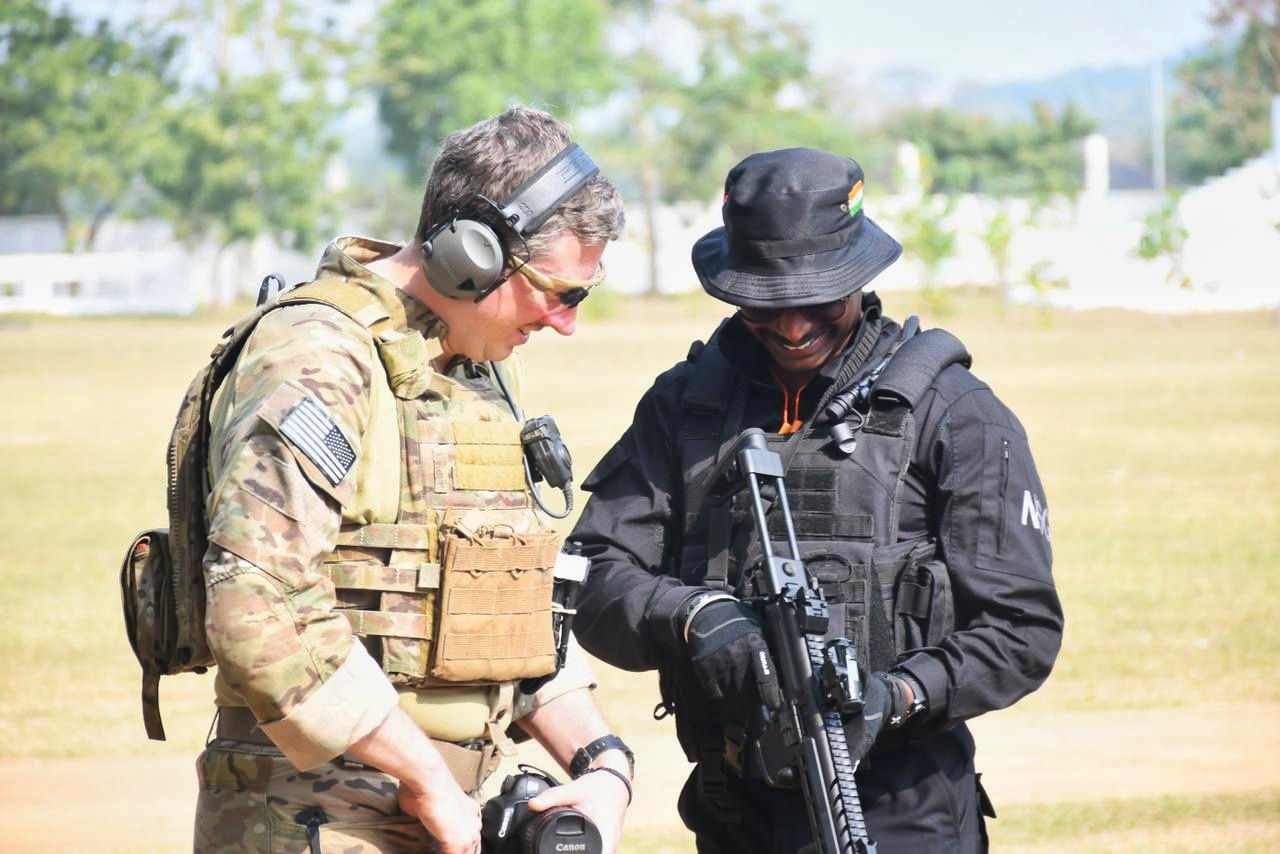
Indian NSG, and United States SOF operator during Tarkash 2023 exercise

Exercise between NSG and United States Army Special Forces, code-named Balanced Iroquois, started on 18 October 2015. This three-week-long exercise was preceded by a joint airborne jump at Aero India 2015. In February 2018, Green Berets from the 1st Special Forces Command (Airborne) conducted a joint training exercise with the NSG in Kolkata. The Green Berets learned some urban warfare strategies from the NSG, while the NSG learned about some advanced equipment of the US soldiers. The drill included intervention techniques, training in the Kolkata Metro system and a drill at the Indian Institute of Technology Kharagpur.

In March 2019, the NSG and 1st Special Forces Group carried out joint exercises in Hyderabad. The sixth edition of the TARKASH exercise between the NSG and the 1st Special Forces Group from 14 January till the end of February 2023. In the same year, the Green Berets and the NSG held another training exercise focused on exchange of subject matter expertise related to CBRNe threats at Manesar from 19 June till the end of the month ahead of the G20 meeting in India. The Indian Army was also involved in the exercise.

== Equipment ==
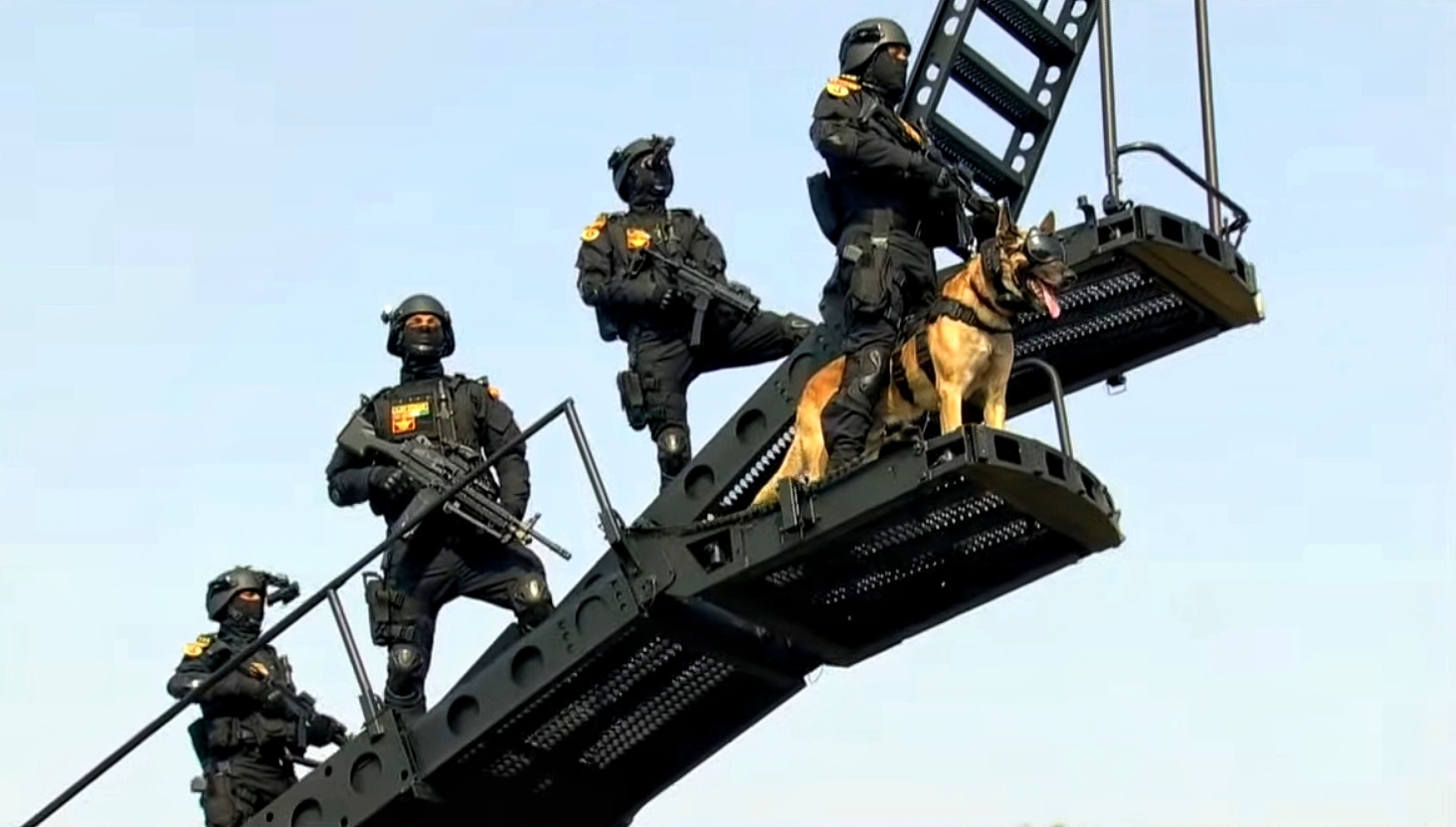
NSG operators armed with SIG MPX, M249 SAWs and MP5s with their Belgian Malinois K9 partner during the 2021 Indian Republic Day parade

=== Small Arms ===
Name	Country of origin	Type	Notes
Glock knives	Austria	Combat knife	
Glock 17	Austria	Semi-automatic pistol	
CornerShot	Israel	Weapons accessories	
Franchi SPAS-15	Italy	Combat shotgun	
Modern Sub Machine Carbine	India	Submachine gun	
SSS Defence G72	India	Submachine gun	500 to be ordered.
Heckler & Koch MP5	Germany	Submachine gun	
CZ Scorpion Evo 3	Czech Republic	Submachine gun	
FN P90	Belgium	Submachine gun	Used in small numbers
SIG MPX	United States		
Colt M4	United States	Assault rifle	Used in small numbers
AK-63	Hungary	Assault rifle	
SIG SG 551	Switzerland	Assault rifle	
TriCa	India	Assault rifle	
Beretta AR70/90	Italy	Assault rifle	
FN F2000	Belgium	Assault rifle	Used in small numbers
FN SCAR	Belgium	Assault rifle	Used in small numbers
IWI X95	Israel	Assault rifle	
IWI Arad	Israel	Assault rifle	
Heckler & Koch MSG-90	Germany	Sniper rifle	
Heckler & Koch PSG1 A1	Germany	Sniper rifle	
Barrett Model 98B	United States	Sniper rifle	
M249	United States	Machine gun	

=== Drones ===
- Black Hornet Nano military micro UAV
- Loitering munition

=== Vehicles and transportation ===
- Ford F550 Super Duty tactical ladder truck
- Maruti Suzuki Gypsy
- Renault Sherpa Light armoured personnel carrier
- Remote-operated vehicle, which can transport 150 kg of Improvised explosive device. It can also transport biological, chemical, and nuclear radioactive materials
- Tata Harrier
- The NSG has access to Indian Air Force transportation aircraft.

== In popular culture ==
- The biographical movie Major is based on the life of Sandeep Unnikrishnan, a team commander of the 51 Special Action Group who was killed in the line of duty during NSG's response to the 2008 Mumbai attacks.
- State of Siege: Temple Attack is a 2021 Indian Hindi-language film based on the 2002 Akshardham Temple attack and the NSG's subsequent operation to encounter and kill the perpetrators.
- State of Siege: 26/11 is a Zee5 web series that presents the 26/11 terror attack incident from the viewpoint of NSG commandos responding to the attacks.
- NSG operators are depicted in the 2019 thriller Hotel Mumbai, which is based on the 2008 Mumbai attacks.
- In the 2023 action-thriller Kill, the main protagonist is an NSG commando.
- NSG commandos are depicted in the 2023 action-thriller Jawan during the metro train hijacking situation in Mumbai, Maharashtra.
- In the 2025 action-thriller Malayalam-language film Identity, the main protagonist is a former NSG commando and an active sky marshal.
- Keerthi Chakra is a 2006 Indian Malayalam-language war film written and directed by Major Ravi which is based on true events related to incidents that took place in Jammu and Kashmir. The main protagonist is an Indian Army officer deputed to the NSG.

== See also ==
- Central Armed Police Forces
- Paramilitary forces of India
- Special Forces of India
- Special Protection Group
- Special Frontier Force
- PRAHAAR, India's national counter-terrorism policy and strategy
