= Bofors 40 mm Automatic Gun L/70 =

Swedish autocannon

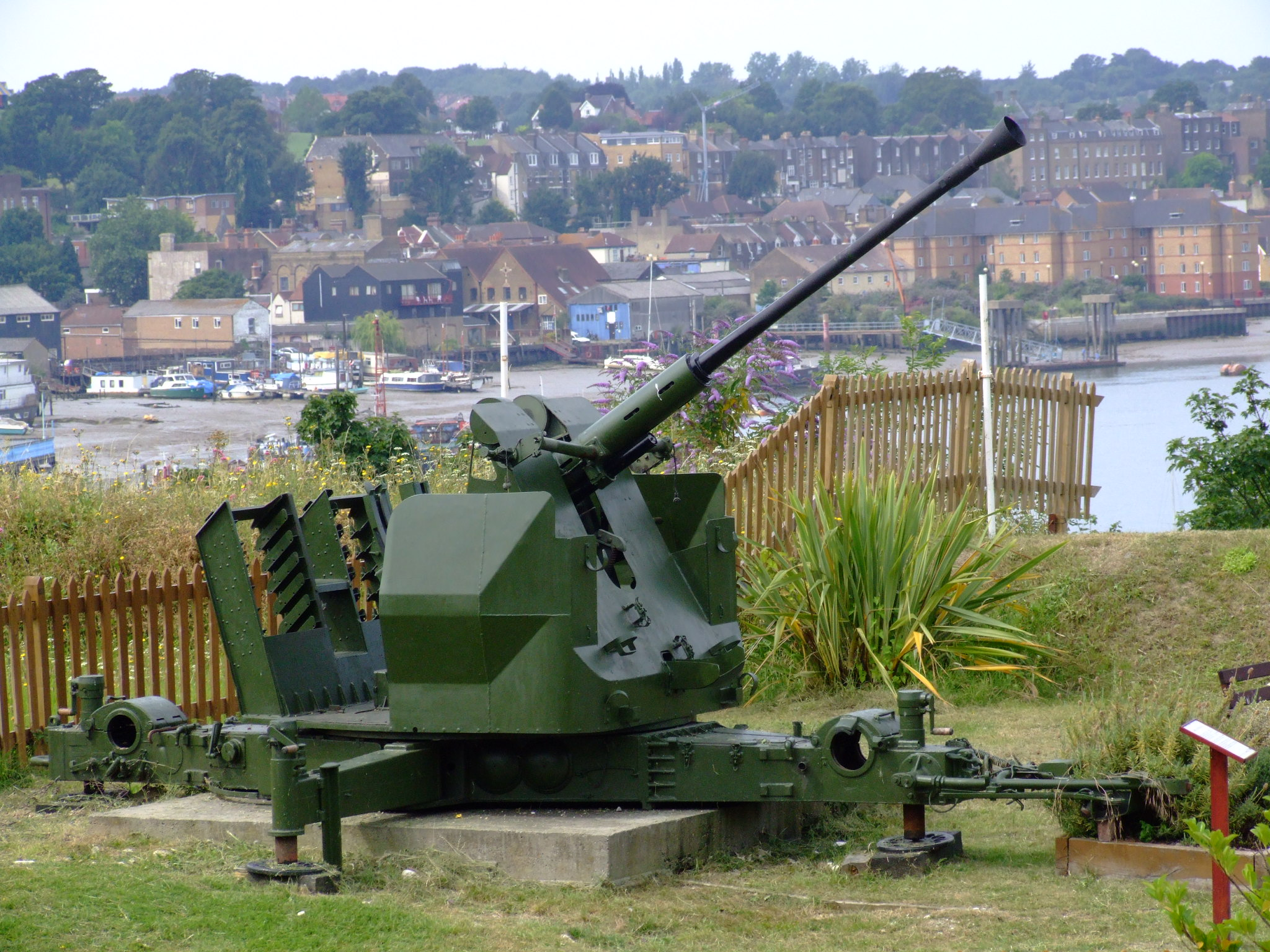
- British Bofors 40 mm Gun L/70 on a 1950s field carriage.
- Type: Autocannon
- Place of origin: Sweden

Service history
- In service: 1952–present
- Used by: See Users
- Wars: Six-Day War; Yom Kippur War; Falklands War; Iran–Iraq War; Yugoslav Wars; Russian invasion of Ukraine; 2025 India–Pakistan conflict

Production history
- Designer: AB Bofors
- Designed: 1946–1950
- Manufacturer: AB Bofors > BAE Systems AB; Breda > OTO Melara
- Produced: 1947–present
- No. built: Over 5,000
- Variants: Several

Specifications
- Mass: 2,400 kg (5,300 lb) – gun 4,800 kg (10,600 lb) – gun & field carriage
- Length: ≈4,000 mm (13 ft 1 in) for most variants
- Barrel length: 2,800 mm (9 ft 2 in) – barrel 3,245 mm (10 ft 7.8 in) – barrel, breech & flash hider
- Cartridge: 40 × 365 mm R
- Cartridge weight: 0.96 kg (2.1 lb)
- Caliber: 40 mm L/70
- Rate of fire: 240, 300, 330 rounds/min
- Muzzle velocity: ≈1,000 m/s (3,300 ft/s) for most shells
- Maximum firing range: 12,500 m (41,000 ft)
- Feed system: 16–26 round hopper
- References: Bofors 1958, Bofors 350 år, navweaps.com

The Bofors 40 mm Automatic Gun L/70, (Bofors 40 mm L/70, Bofors 40 mm/70, Bofors 40/70 and the like), is a multi-purpose autocannon developed by the Swedish arms manufacturer AB Bofors (today BAE Systems Bofors) during the second half of the 1940s as a modern replacement for their World War II-era Bofors 40 mm L/60 gun-design. It was initially intended as a dedicated anti-aircraft weapon, being sold as Bofors 40 mm Automatic A.A. Gun L/70, but has since its conception been redeveloped into a multi-purpose weapon capable of firing both sabot projectiles and programmable ammunition.

The 40 mm L/60 was introduced in 1932 and was a useful weapon for its era, being widely used among many forces and produced under license in several countries. The introduction of faster fighter-bombers and especially the widespread introduction of jet-powered aircraft in the post-war era severely limited its abilities. The L/70 was designed to improve both its operating range, to give it more time to respond to targets, and greatly increase its rate of fire to increase the odds of a hit. The most superficial changes are the longer L/70 barrel, double cooling vents on the jacket and the fact that the weapon comes chambered for a more powerful 40×365mmR cartridge (vs 40×311mmR for the L/60). The changes are minor enough that it looks similar to the L/60. Most important is the new ejection system which ejects the empty cartridge cases out from the opposite side to the feed, compared to the system on the L/60 which ejects the cases straight out the back of the gun. This system change almost doubled the mechanical rate of fire from the previous system. The operation is otherwise similar to the L/60, combining a self-ejecting gun with a recoil-operated autoloader in the same receiver.

The L/70 design never achieved the same popularity and historical status as the original L/60 design but has still seen great export and popularity to this day, having been adopted by around 40 different nations and even being accepted as NATO-standard in November 1953. It is still being produced and sold (since March 2005 by BAE Systems AB), and several variants exist for both field and naval applications. A notable variant is the Bofors 40/70B "light armoured vehicle variant" which is in use on the Swedish strf 9040 and Korean K21 infantry fighting vehicles.

Despite the L/70 being a separate development to the older L/60 design, the similarities and success between the two guns has caused them both to be widely known simply as "the Bofors" or the "Bofors 40 mm gun", which at times causes the guns to be confused as one and the same weapon.

== History ==
By the end of World War II, the speed of jet aircraft enabled them to withdraw quickly out of range of the Bofors L/60; a longer range was necessary. A higher rate of fire was also required, increasing the number of rounds fired over the period of an engagement. Bofors considered either updating the 40 mm, or alternatively making a much more powerful 57 mm design. In the end they did both.

The new 40 mm design used a larger 40×365R round firing a slightly lighter 870 g shell at a much higher 1,030 m/s (3,379 fps) muzzle velocity. The rate of fire was increased to 240 rounds per minute (4.0 rounds per second), similar to the German Flak 43. The main design change that allowed this increase was the introduction of a loading tray which tilted upwards after chambering a round and deflected the spent casing ejecting after a shot downwards with its bottom. Additionally, the carriage was modified to be power-laid, the power being supplied by a generator placed on the front of the carriage. The first version was produced in 1947, accepted in 1948 as the "40 mm lvakan m/48", and entered Swedish service in 1951. Additional changes over the years have increased the firing rate first to 300 rpm (5.0 rounds per second), and later to 330 rpm (5.5 rps). The introduction of a 40 mm proximity fuzed round in the early 1970s was another improvement.

Foreign sales started, as they had in the past, with the Netherlands and the United Kingdom. In November 1953 it was accepted as the NATO standard anti-aircraft gun, and was soon produced in the thousands. The L/70 was also used as the basis for a number of SPAAGs, including the U.S. Army's failed M247 Sergeant York. The UK's RAF Regiment adopted the L70 to replace its L60 guns in 1957, replacing its last examples in 1977 with the Rapier missile system.

In 1970s Zastava Arms acquired a license from Bofors to produce the L/70 together with a laser-computer group. Ammunition for the L/70 is produced locally for both domestic and export use by Sloboda Čačak

In 1979 the Royal Netherlands Air Force acquired 25 KL/MSS-6720 Flycatcher radar systems and upgraded 75 of their 40L70s to create 25 firing units for static air base defence. The improved guns had an increased rate of fire (300 rounds/min), and the loading mechanism was provided with extended guides so that it could hold 22 cartridges. A 220 volt diesel generator was mounted onto the undercarriage, powered by a Volkswagen engine.

In 1989 the Royal Netherlands Army acquired 30 Flycatcher systems, each fielded with two modified Bofors 40L70G guns ('G' for 'gemodificeerd', 'modified'). In the 40L70G version the loading mechanism was further improved and could be recognized by open rear guides. The 40L70G guns were also provided with muzzle velocity radars.

Early in the 1990s the Royal Netherlands Air Force 40L70s were upgraded to the 'G' version.

In the gun-armed versions of the Swedish Army Combat Vehicle 90 a cartridge-fed automatic version of the L/70 autocannon is fitted. In order to fit inside the vehicle, the gun is mounted upside down. New armour piercing and programmable ammunition have also been developed. Germany has used L/70 guns on its Type 352, Type 333 and Type 332 minesweeper vessels, although these will be replaced by Rheinmetall MLG 27 remote-controlled gun systems until 2008. Until the early 1980s L/70 guns guided by D7B radars were in widespread use in the anti-aircraft role in the German Navy and German Air Force, until replaced by Roland SAMs.

The L/70 is also used by the Indian Abhay IFV, which carries 210 APFSDS and high-explosive rounds. In 2014 Indian Army started upgrading its L/70 guns to modern standards electric turret drive system and digital fire control system with thermal imaging cameras, laser range finder, muzzle velocity radar for accurate engagement of targets and has automatic target tracking capability under all weather conditions. The gun has the ability to be integrated with tactical and fire control radars to give more flexibility in its deployment. The guns have been equipped with ZADS EW suite for detection and suppression of drones between 10–10,000 meters and has the ability to "soft-kill" the drones without using the gun. Upon detecting a drone the ZADS indicates the direction of the approaching drone, then the day and night cameras align themselves towards the target and lock on to it and auto track it, the system then passes the target coordinates on to the L-70 gun through a customised hardware interface. The gun received the coordinates in ‘remote’ mode and aligns itself towards the target allowing the operator to lock on and fire. In 2017, Bharat Electronics Limited (BEL) won a key contract to upgrade 200 L/70 guns, replacing hydraulic drives with electric actuators for improved accuracy, speed, and reliability. A new Integrated Fire Control System with a digital ballistic computer was also added for real-time trajectory calculation. An electro-optical suite to ensure effective targeting in all weather conditions was also fitted. In 2024, BEL further upgraded the L/70 guns by adding a radar- and Radio Frequency (RF)-based Drone Guard System (DGS) to detect, track, and neutralize rogue drones. During the 2025 India-Pakistan crisis, the upgraded L/70 guns were used to quickly detect and shoot down numerous Pakistani drones along the western border, effectively neutralizing the large-scale drone incursion and protecting key sites. According to Indian sources, Turkish-origin Songar and YIHA were also shot down using advanced electro-optical sights and airburst ammunition during the course of the brief conflict.

BAE Systems Bofors unveiled the Tridon Mk2 at Eurosatory 2024. Primarily intended for the ground-based air defense (GBAD) role, it is designed as an inexpensive counter-unmanned aerial systems (C-UAS) weapon in addition to traditional aircraft and missile threats. The system is based on the Bofors 40 Mk4 naval gun and can be mounted on various 6×6 and 8×8 trucks to provide mobile air defense. The gun has a maximum range of up to 12,500 m, a rate of fire of 300 rpm, maximum elevation of 80°, and can traverse 360°.

== Ammunition ==
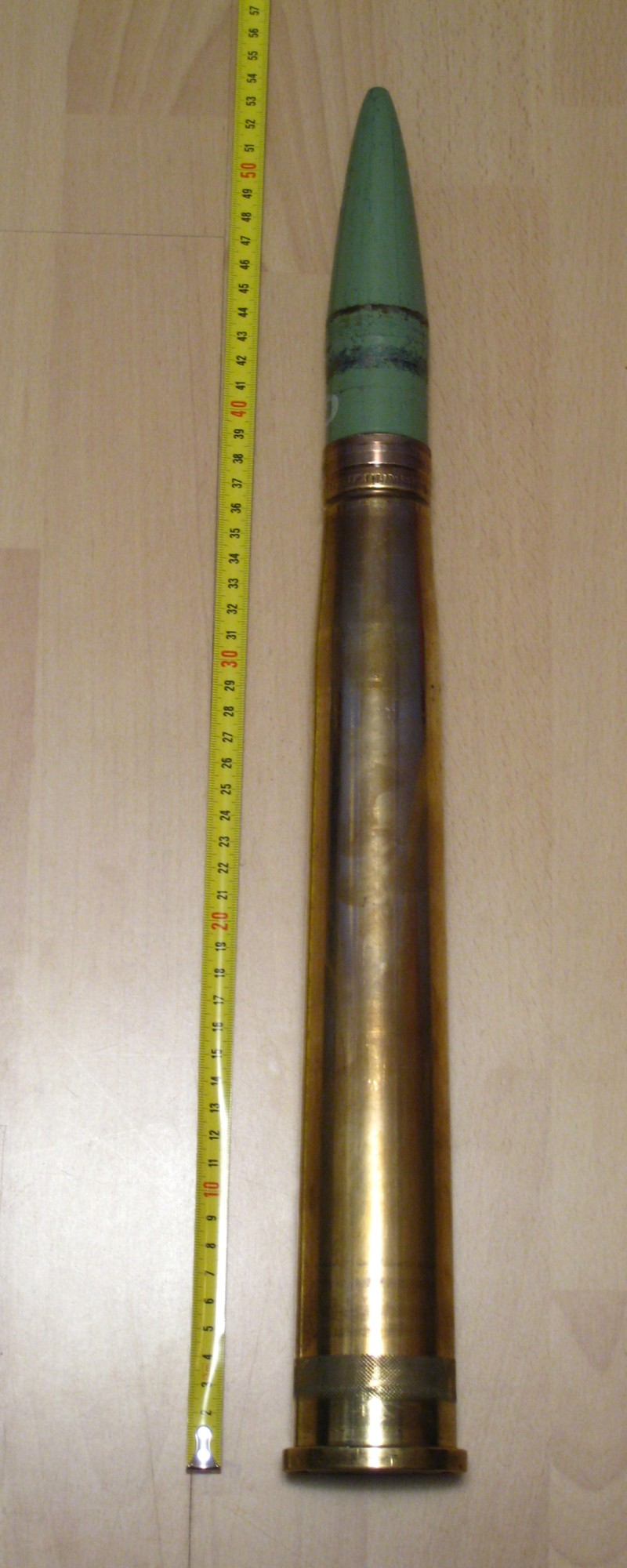
A 40×365R cartridge with a tape measure in centimeters for scale

NATO designation	HE	HEI	HE-T	HEI-T	PFHE	AP-T	TP-T	TP	Blank
Projectile mass (g)	964	964	964	964	880	930	964	964	920
Propellant mass (g)	480	480	480	480	480	480	480	480	480
Explosive mass (g)	95	95	83	83	83				
Complete round mass (g)	2500	2500	2500	2500	2420	2470	2500	2500	2420
Explosive type	RDX	RDX+AI	RDX	RDX+AI	RDX				
Complete round length (mm)	535	535	535	535	534.5	497	535	535	535
Muzzle velocity (m/s)	1005	1005	1005	1005	1025	1025	1005	1005	
Self-destruction time (s)	8-13	8-13	8-13	8-13	3.5-10	none	none	none	none
Tracer burning time (s)			4	4		4	4		

== Variants ==
- L/70 BOFI (Bofors Optronic Fire control Instrument) gun system: Fair weather system, with electro optic fire control system (with a computer and laser range finder) and proximity fused ammunition. A "fair weather system".
- L/70 BOFI (All weather): Multisensor fire control system with a J band radar. Provides automatic acquisition and tracking with an effective range of 4 km without external radar input.
- L/70 REMO (Renovation and Modernisation): Package aimed at extending life span and increasing effectiveness. Higher rate of fire, new fire control system/air burst programming, and ammunition.
- L/70 40mm Netherlands upgrade: New servo system, amplifiers, increased rate of fire (to 300 rds/min), ammo racks, and diesel power unit.
- L/70 40mm Spanish upgrade: Felis electro optic automatic tracking system (HD TV set, automatic tracking, telemetry laser, portable target designator, and radar interface)
- AOS 40mm L70 FADM (Field Air Defense Mount): Singapore Technologies electric drive aiming system
- TRIDON 40mm L/70: Bofors installed on Volvo 725 6×6 trucks with fully enclosed, armor protected cab for a crew of five, with only two crew required. Did not enter service.
- LVS 40mm L/70: Equipped with LVS modular fire-control system by Saab. Entered service with the Swedish Army and Royal Thai Army in 1994 and 1997.
- OTO Marlin 40: Modern multipurpose naval gun system developed by Leonardo.
- Bofors 40 Mk3: Naval gun that can fire smart 40 mm 3P all-target ammunition.
- Fath: Iranian unlicensed copy.

=== DARDO ===
DARDO is a close-in weapon system (CIWS) built by the Italian companies Breda and Oto Melara. Breda Meccanica Bresciana (now in Oto Melara) of Italy uses the Bofors 40 mm L/70 gun in its anti-aircraft weapon systems Type 64, Type 106, Type 107, Type 564 and Type 520. They have developed also the CIWS system named DARDO for the Italian Army and Navy. A newer development from Breda, the Fast Forty, employs two modified Bofors 40s, each with an improved rate of fire of 450 rpm, as opposed to 240–330 rpm for L/70 version. For naval use, it is normally equipped with a 736-round magazine and a dual feed mechanism.

=== Bofors 40 Mk4 ===
Bofors 40 Mk4 is a modern multipurpose naval gun system developed by BAE Systems AB. This is the upgraded version of the Bofors 40 Mk3. The gun is 40% lighter, as well as smaller and more cost effective than the previous generation Mk3.

=== Tridon Mk2 ===
BAE Systems Bofors unveiled the Tridon Mk2 at Eurosatory 2024. Primarily intended for the ground-based air defense (GBAD) role, it is designed as an inexpensive counter-unmanned aerial systems (C-UAS) weapon in addition to traditional aircraft and missile threats. The system is based on the Bofors 40 Mk4 naval gun and can be mounted on various 6×6 and 8×8 trucks as well as BvS10 tracked armoured vehicle to provide mobile air defense. The gun has a maximum range of up to 12,500 m, a rate of fire of 300 rpm, maximum elevation of 80°, and can traverse 360°.

Sweden has committed 400 million euros to the purchase of Tridon Mk2 for Ukraine for air defence against drones.

== Image gallery ==
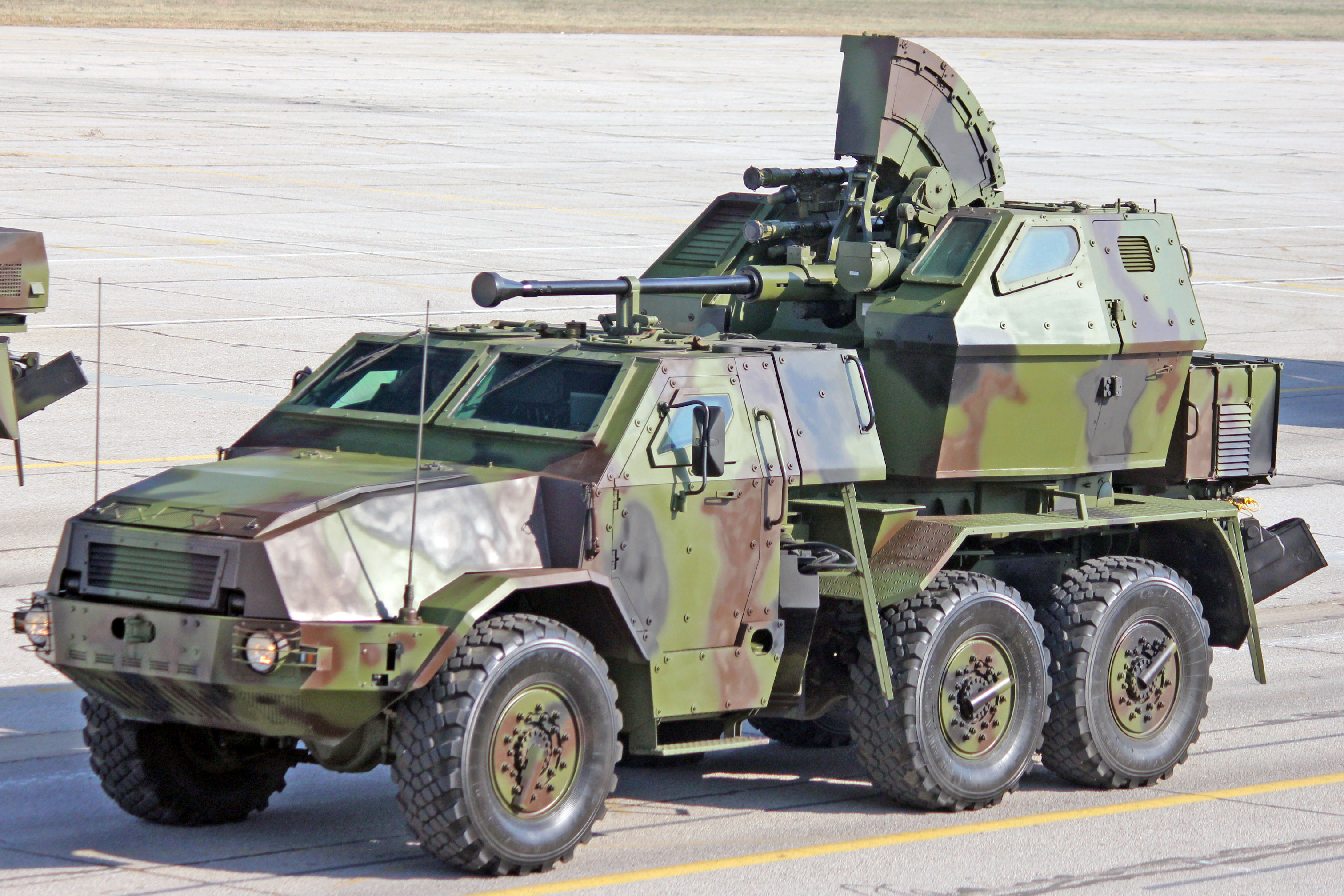
Serbian PASARS-16 hybrid SPAAAG

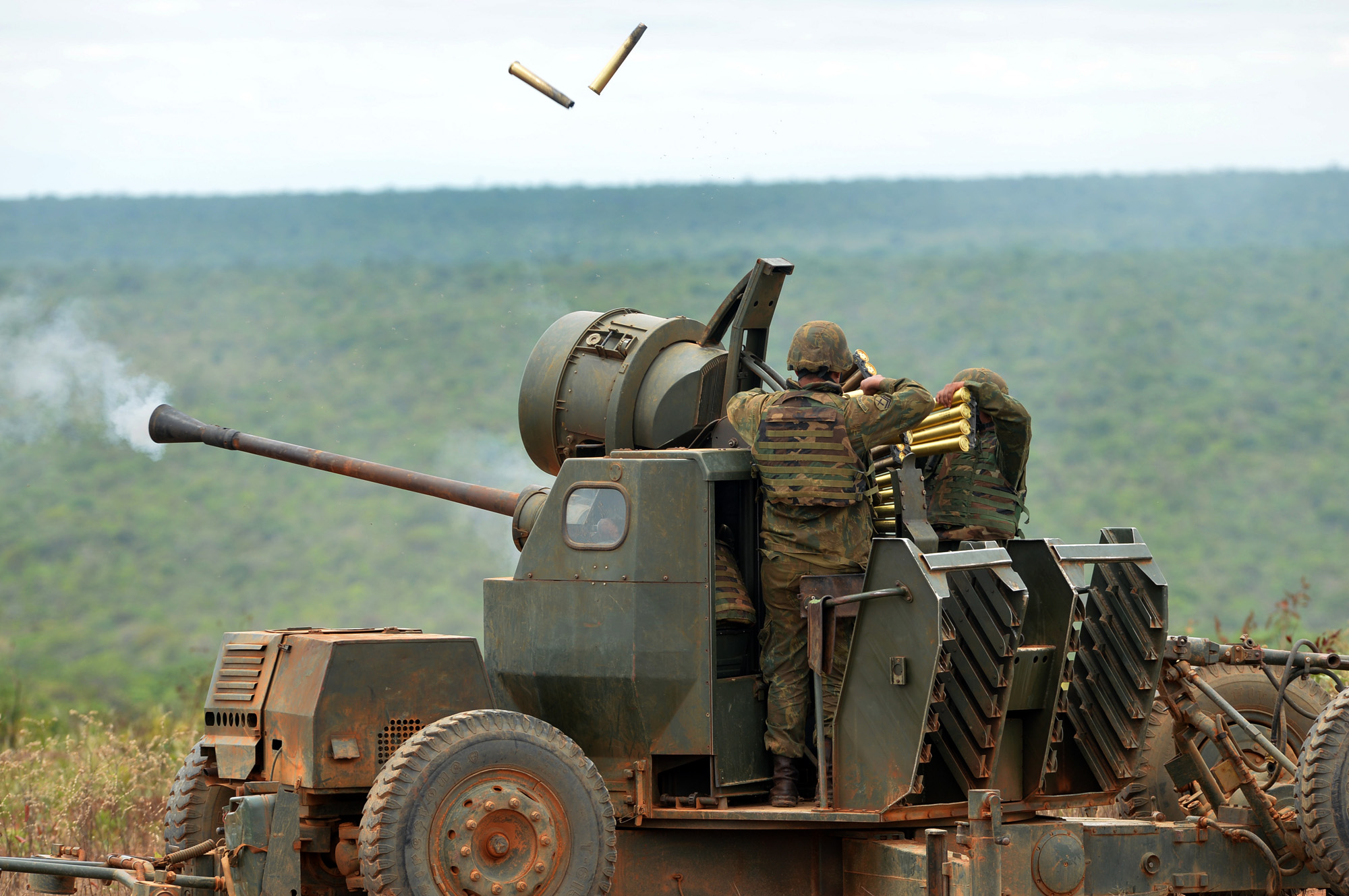
Brazilian Marine Corps shooting a BOFI-R

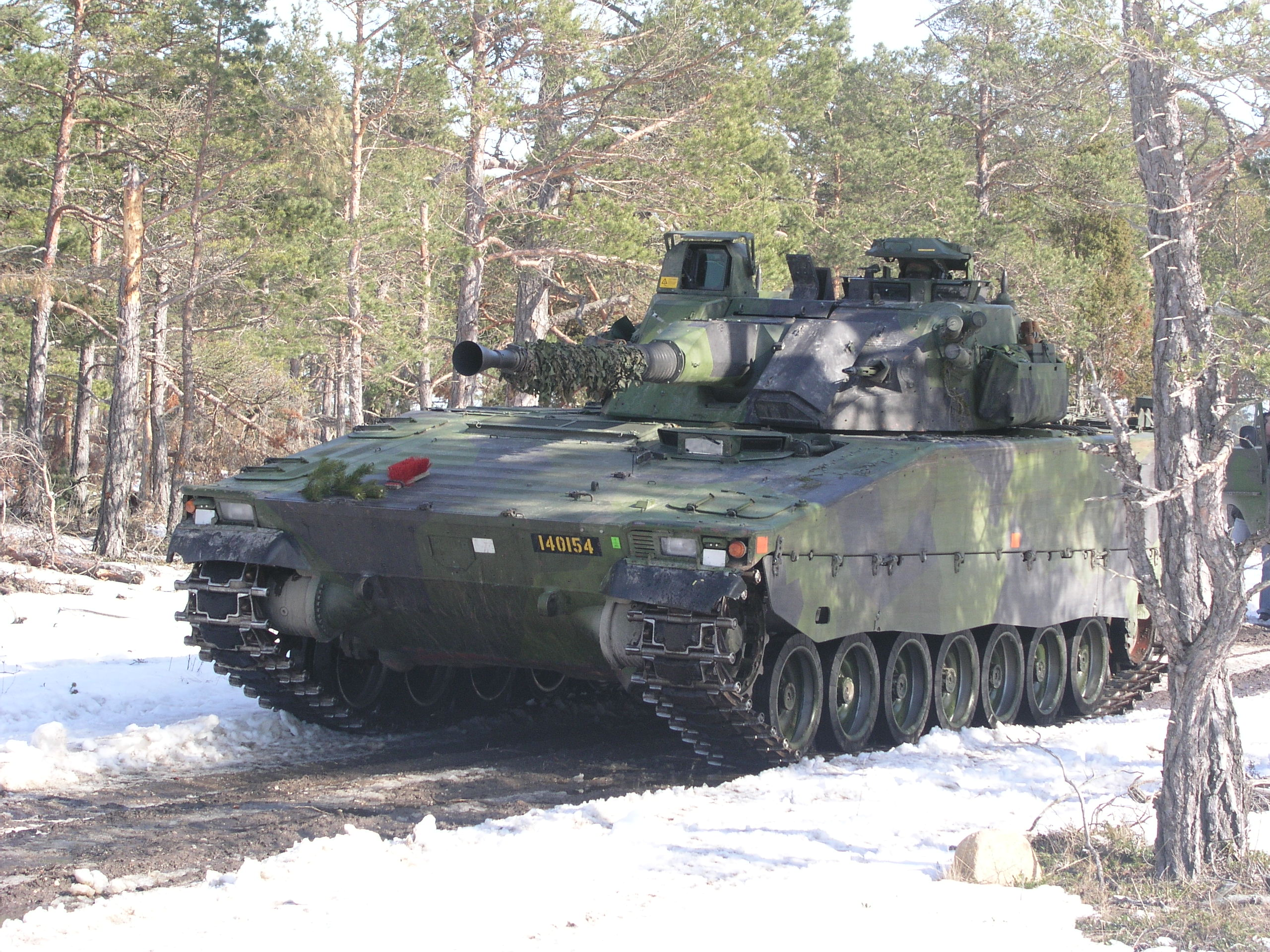
Bofors 40 armed Swedish Combat Vehicle 90 (CV9040)

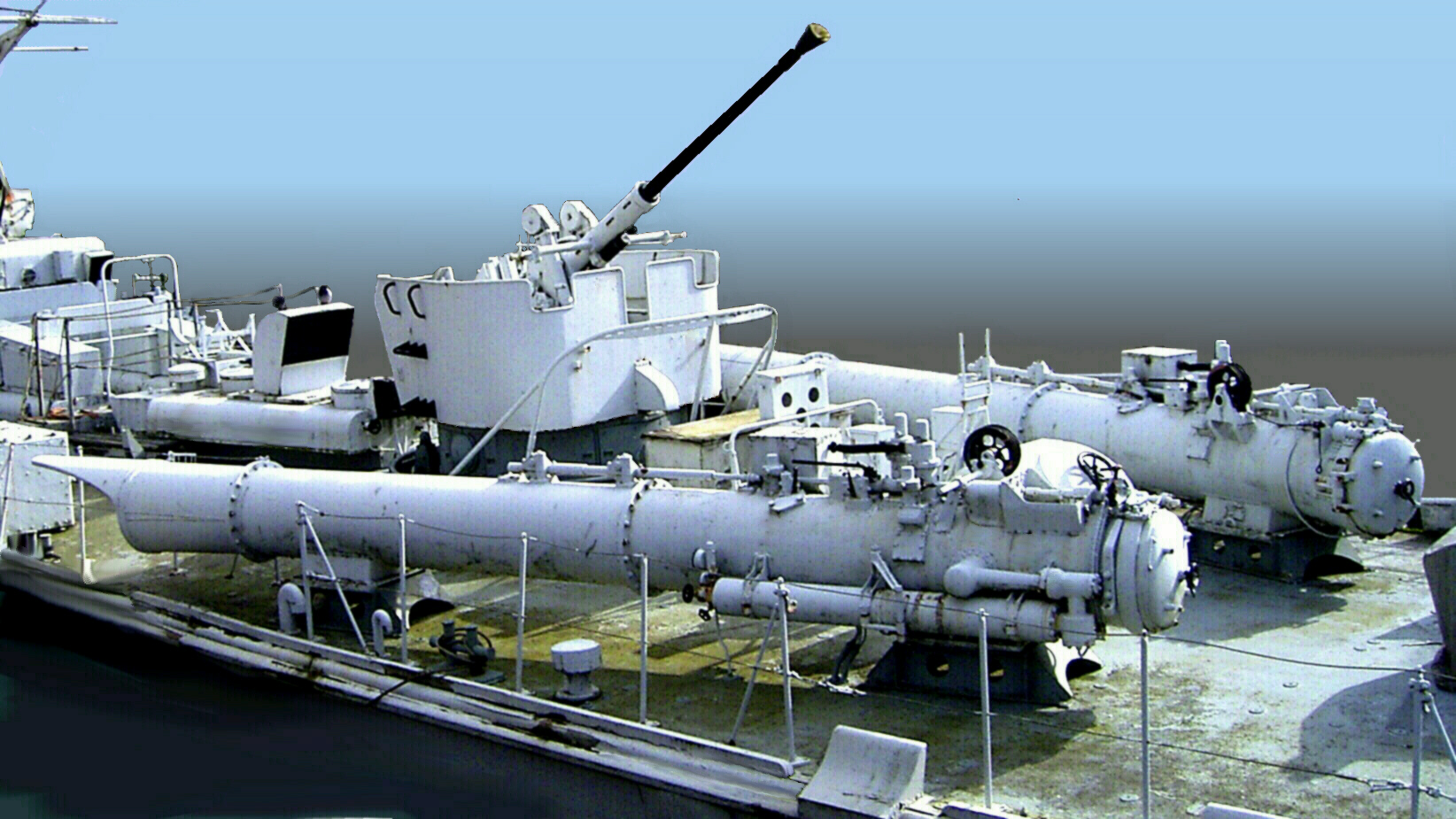
SAK 40L/70-350 on board Jaguar-class fast attack craft

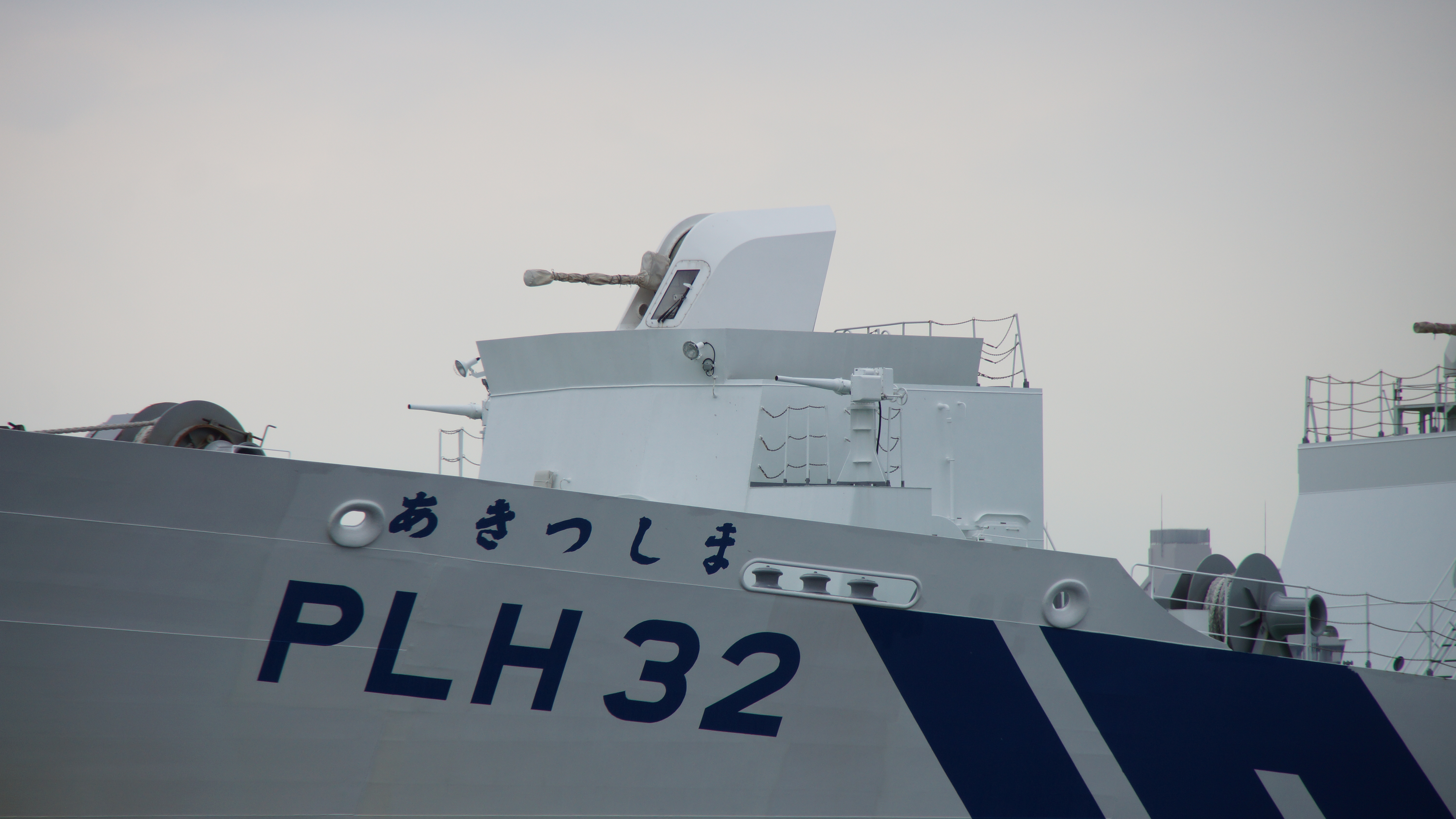
Mk.3 on board the Japanese Coast Guard vessel Akitsushima

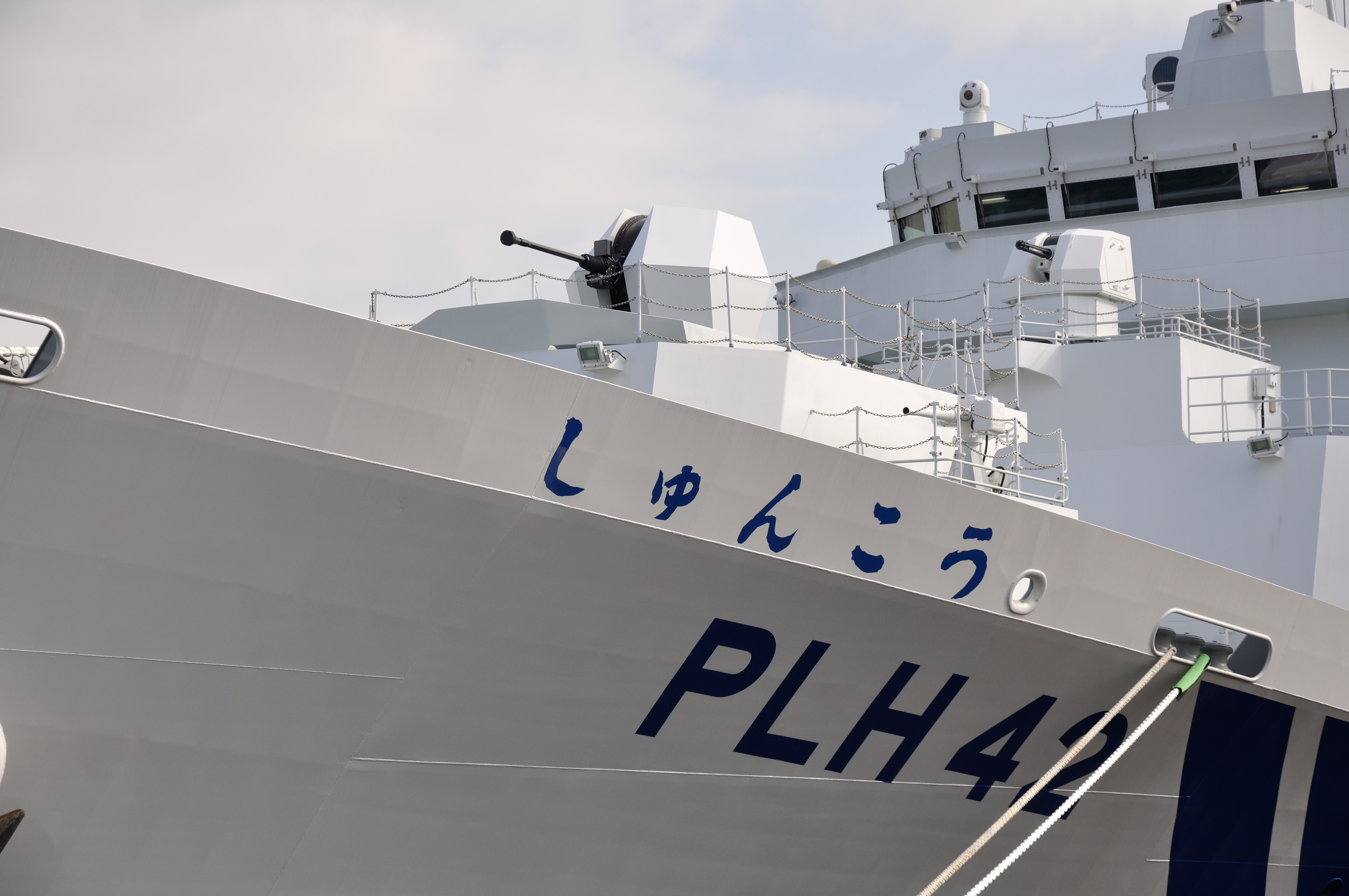
Bofors 40 Mk4 on board the Japanese Coast Guard vessel Shunkō

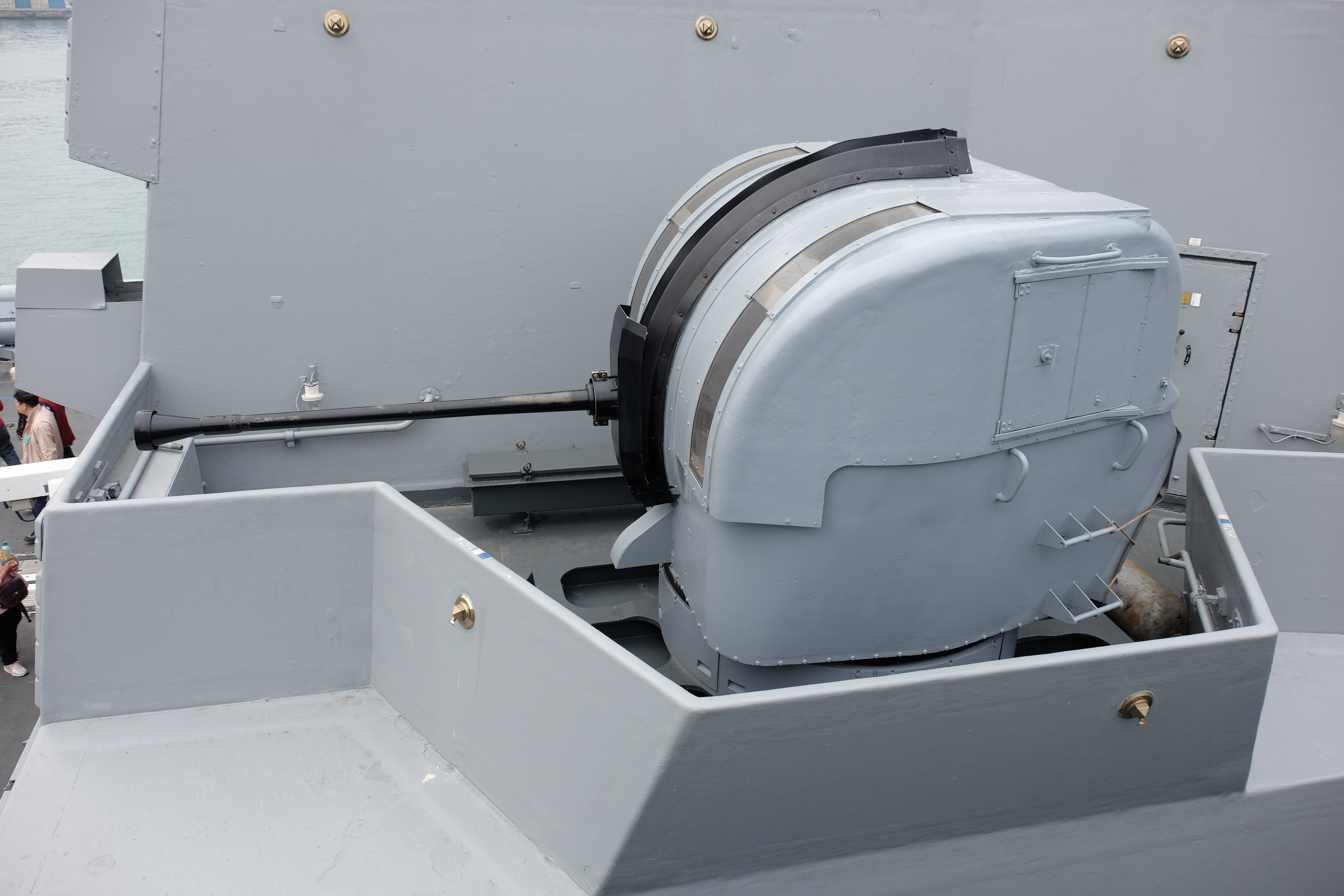
Bofors 40 mm L70 gun on board the Kang Ding-class frigate ROCS Si Ning

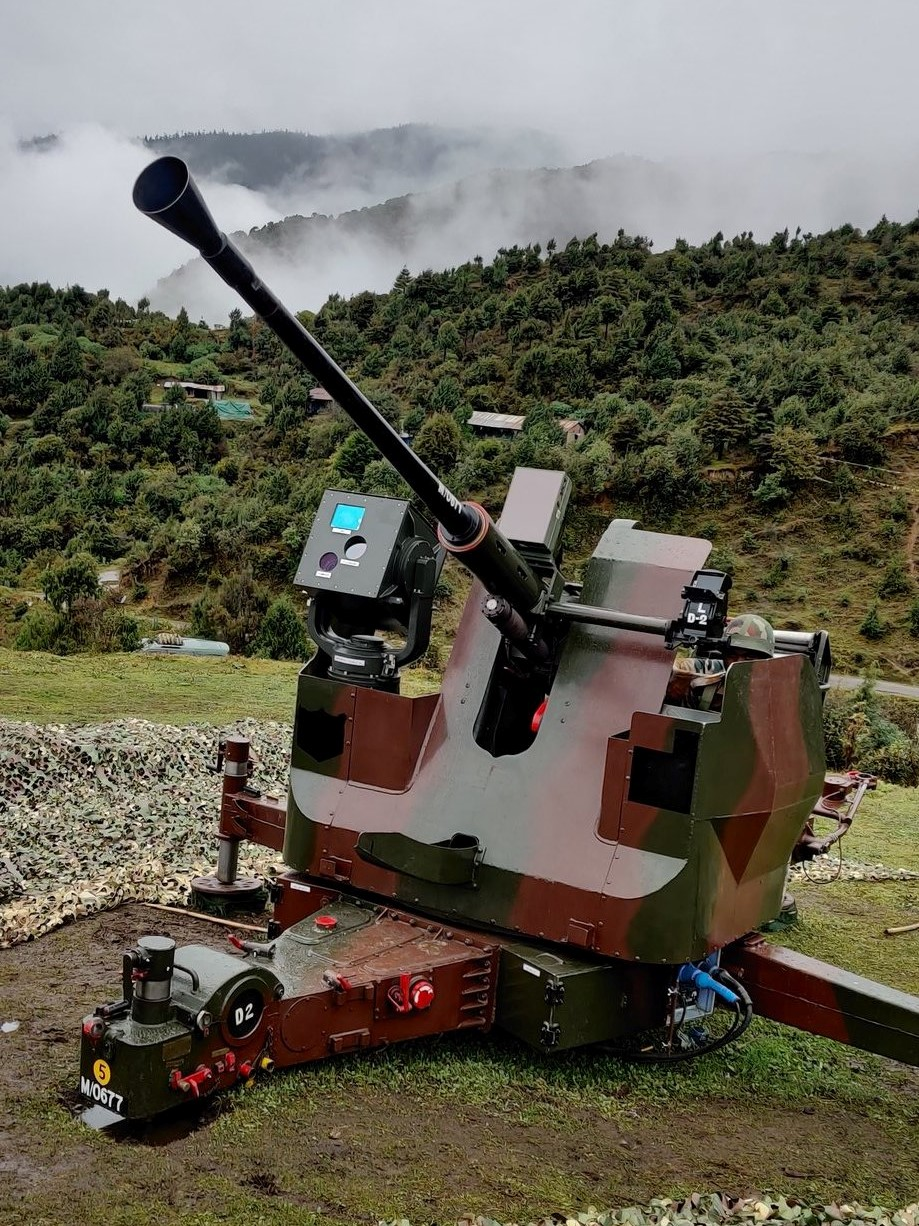
Upgraded L70 gun of the Indian Army deployed in North East India

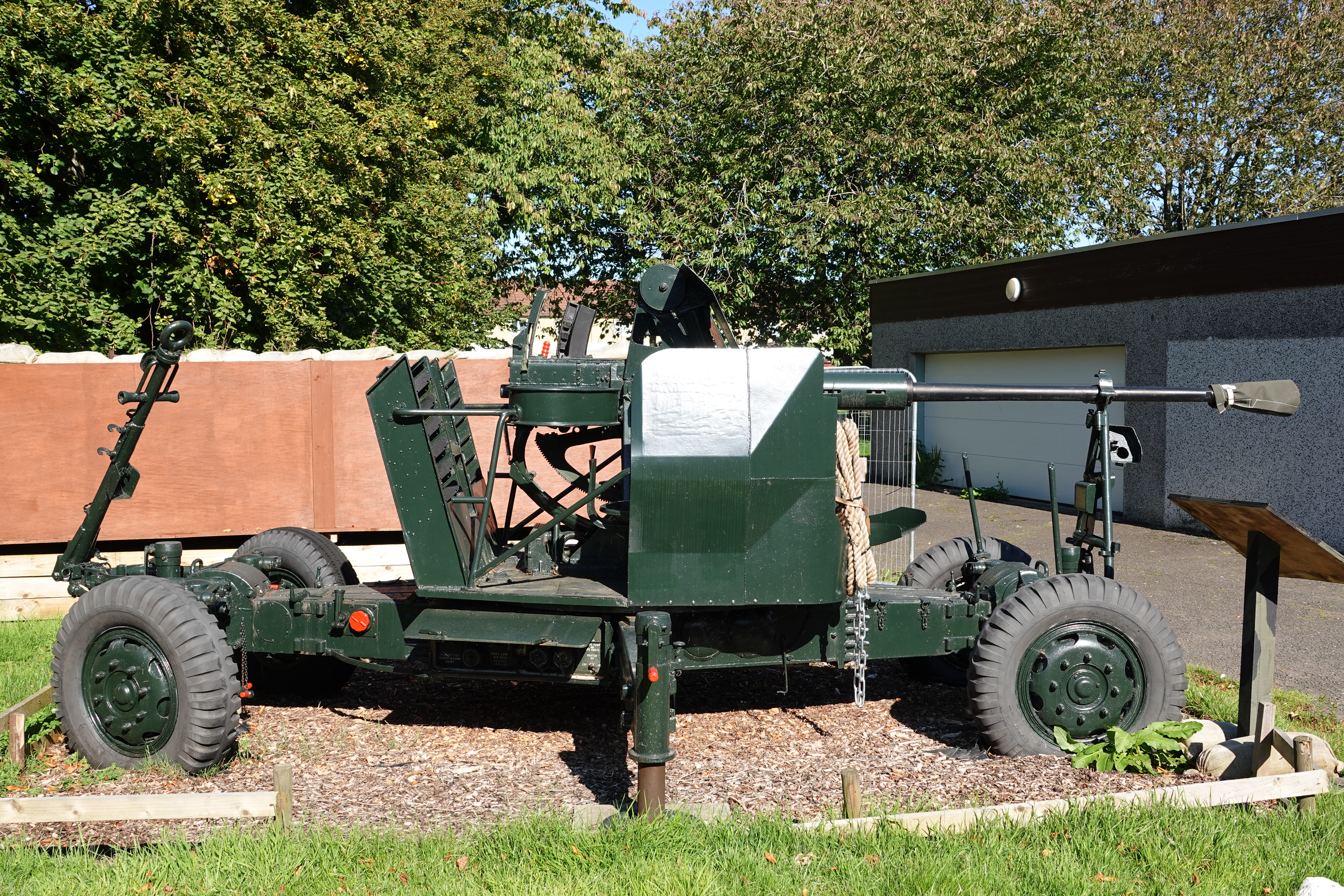
RAF Regiment Bofors 40 mm L70 preserved at the Military Museum Scotland

== Users ==
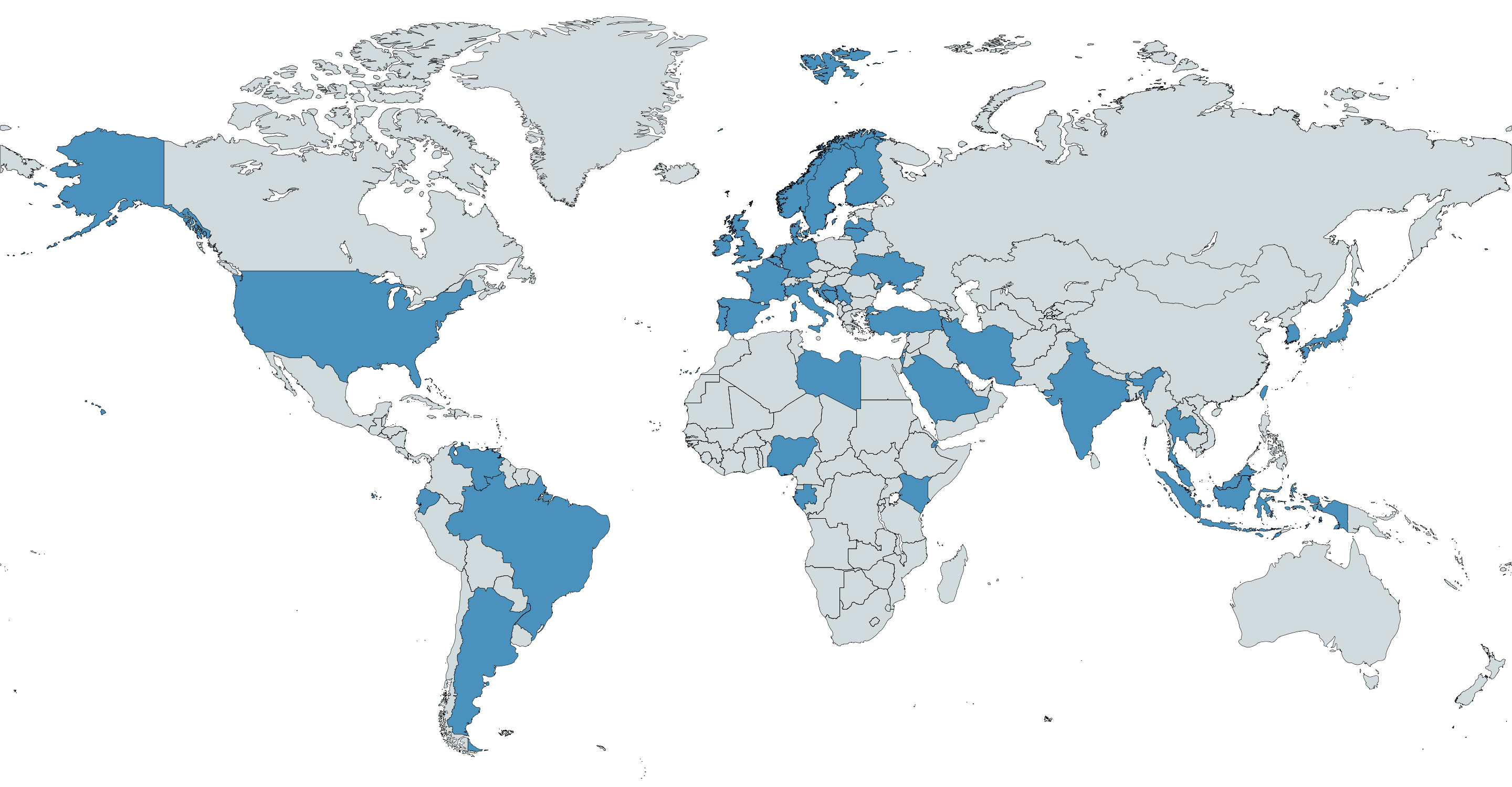
Map with L/70 users in blue

- Argentina
- Bahrain
- Belgium
- Bosnia and Herzegovina
- Brazil
- Croatia 12 units paired to Giraffe radars
- Denmark
- Djibouti
- Ecuador
- Finland: 40/70 MkII in Rauma-class missile corvettes and Katanpää-class mine countermeasure vessels
- France
- Gabon
- Iceland:
- France
- India: Bofors L/70 is built under license.
- Indonesia
- Iran
- Ireland: 32 purchased from Netherlands in 2003. Paired with eight Flycatcher radars. Out of service since the disbandment of the Air Defence Regiment in 2012.
- Israel
- Italy: Built under license by Breda.
- Japan
- Kenya
- Latvia
- Libya: Used during the Gaddafi era
- Lithuania: Purchased from Sweden in 2000, donated to Ukraine in 2023
- Malaysia
- Netherlands: Built under license at Wilton-Fijenoord.
- Nigeria
- Norway
- Portugal
- Saudi Arabia
- Serbia
- Sweden: 40/70 MkI as 40 mm automatkanon m/48 and 40/70B as 40 mm automatkanon m/70B
- Spain: Built under license
- Republic of Korea: Several variants
- Taiwan:
- Thailand:
- Turkey:
- Ukraine: Defence aid from Lithuania and the Netherlands As of 6 April 2026 Sweden announced that it would commit 400 million euros to purchasing the system for Ukrainian defence against drones.
- United Kingdom: Built under license
- United States: Built under license
- Venezuela:

== See also ==
- Bofors 40 mm L/60 gun
- Bofors 57 mm Naval Automatic Gun L/60
- Bofors 57 mm Naval Automatic Gun L/70
- Bofors 75 mm Model 1929
- AZP_S-60
- 40CT cannon
- List of anti-aircraft guns
- List of naval anti-aircraft guns
