= Songar =

Songar may refer to:

- Asisguard Songar, Turkish combat drone rotorcraft
- Triazolam, by trade name Songar
- Zungar people
