= Flycatcher (radar) =

Short range air defense fire control system

Hollandse Signaal Apparaten KL/MSS-6720 Flycatcher
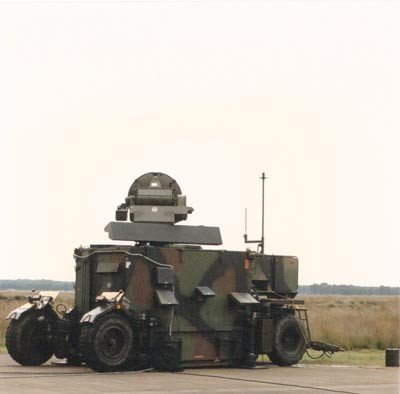
- Country of origin: The Netherlands
- Introduced: 1979
- No. built: ±200
- Type: Air defense fire control radar
- Frequency: Search radar frequency I/J band Tracking radar frequency K band
- Beamwidth: 1.4° (horizontal); 30° (vertical)
- RPM: 60
- Range: 20km
- Power: 160W

The Flycatcher (KL/MSS-6720) radarsystem is a dual I/J/K-Band short range air defense fire control system. It has an all-weather capability and track-while-scan capability and can simultaneously control three anti-aircraft guns or SAM rocket launchers. The radar system used in the Flycatcher is identical to the system used in the PRTL/Cheetah, the Dutch version of the self-propelled anti-aircraft gun Gepard. The Goalkeeper CIWS uses a similar radar system.

The Flycatcher was developed by Hollandse Signaal Apparaten B.V. or in short Signaal or HSA (now Thales Nederland) as successor to their successful L4/5 (KL/MSS-3012) fire control system.

== Description ==
The Flycatcher system is contained within a towed trailer. Mounted on the roof of it are a search radar and a tracking radar with coaxial passive daylight TV tracking system. The Flycatcher system is built into a standard military Craig container, with a semi-detachable trailer bogey. The antennas are retractable to facilitate air transport the Flycatcher, either as a slung load or as fixed wing cargo. The operator's compartment and the electronics are protected by the controlled environment provided by the Craig shelter. The container houses a crew of two, and a power generator is attached to the front of the container.

Guns or launchers are connected to the Flycatcher with a regular infantry field wire. Maximum distance from the Flycatcher to the guns or launchers is ±1000 metres. An unobstructed line-of-sight is required between the Flycatcher and each guns or launcher in order to align the gun or launcher with the Flycatcher. Ballistic factors such as temperature, humidity, wind direction and velocity as well as gun data such as muzzle velocity are manually or via sensor interface entered into the fire-control system of the Flycatcher. Using the tracking radar system to track a weather balloon, the Flycatcher can obtain on-the-spot wind speed and direction.

== Operational history ==
=== Netherlands ===
The KL/MSS-6720 Flycatcher radar system is in use by the Royal Netherlands Air Force since 1979. The 25 Royal Netherlands Air Force Flycatchers are used in a very short range air defence (VSHORAD) configuration in combination with three modified Bofors 40L70 guns. They were used for static air base defense.

Thirty Flycatcher systems were supplied to the Royal Netherlands Army under a contract placed in early 1987. Production, which commenced immediately, result ed in the first units being delivered in April 1989. Deliveries were completed within 36 months. The Royal Netherlands Army Flycatchers are used in combination with two modified Bofors 40L70G guns.

=== India ===
In August 1985 India ordered the Signaal Flycatcher, although only a limited number was built in the Netherlands. Extensive production of Flycatcher for the Indian Armed Forces is being undertaken by Bharat Electronics Limited (BEL).

The Indian Flycatchers were to be deployed with Bofors 40 mm L/60 gun and Bofors 40 mm Automatic Gun L/70 AA guns, but might also be used to guide the Trishul Surface-to-air missile.

=== United States ===
The United States acquired one copy of the Flycatcher fire control system, which was delivered to the United States Air Force in mid-1984. Trials have been conducted with the system in the Nevada desert. There have been no further developments.

=== Thailand ===
Twelve Flycatcher systems were ordered by Thailand in 1981. Some are deployed on a basis of one radar supporting a battery of six gun mountings. In 2005 the Netherlands Ministry of Defence (MoD) announced the delivery of eight Flycatcher search and tracking radar fire-control systems for low-level air defense with 16 Bofors Defense 40 mm L/70 guns to Thailand through Thales. In a second deal, the MoD has sold 13 Thales Flycatcher radar systems, 34 Bofors 40 mm L/70 guns and a training simulator to Thales. The Hengelo, Netherlands-based company will sell-on eight of these Flycatchers and 16 guns to Thailand.

== Operators ==
- Argentina - Marines
- India – 12 procured from OEM and 248 license produced by Bharat Electronics under license.
- Ireland – 8; bought second hand from Dutch armed forces in 2003
- Netherlands (Royal Netherlands Army) - 30
- Netherlands (Royal Netherlands Air Force) - 25
- Thailand - 28; 12 in 1981 plus 16 former Dutch Flycatchers bought second hand in 2005
- Turkey - 24
- Venezuela - 18
- United States (United States Air Force) - 1
