= Japanese patrol vessel Shunkō =

Shunkō-class patrol vessel of Japanese Coast Guard

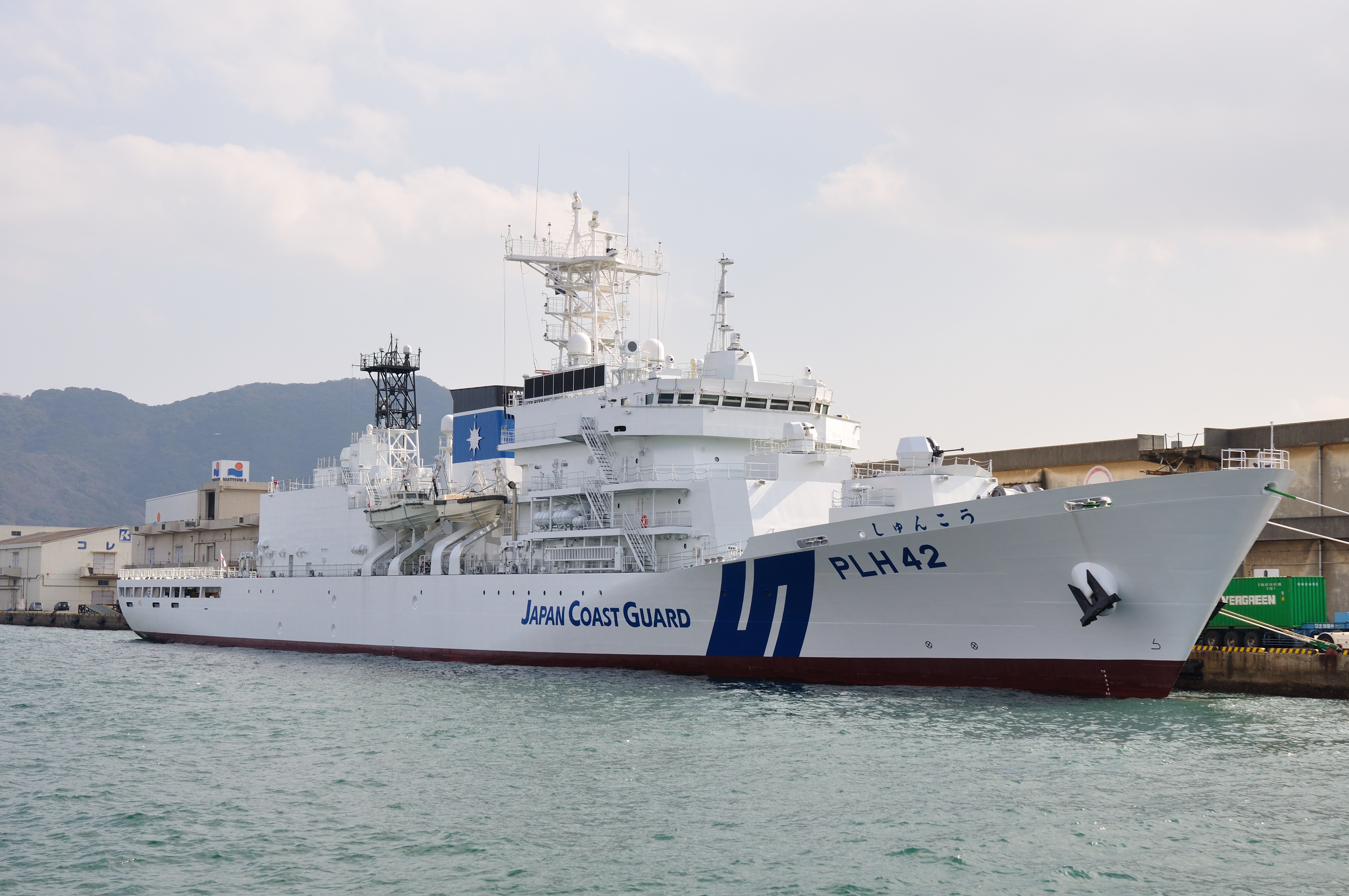
- Shunkō on 4 February 2020

History

Japan
- Name: Shunkō; (しゅんこう)
- Namesake: Shunkō
- Builder: Mitsubishi, Shimonoseki
- Laid down: 15 February 2018
- Launched: 20 March 2019
- Commissioned: 19 February 2020
- Identification: IMO number: 9827073; MMSI number: 431518000; Callsign: 7KEU; Pennant number: PLH-42
- Status: Active

General characteristics
- Class & type: Shunkō-class heavy patrol vessel
- Tonnage: 6,742 GT
- Length: 140.0 m (459 ft 4 in)
- Beam: 16.5 m (54 ft 2 in)
- Propulsion: 2 × shafts; 4 × IHI-SEMT Pielstick 16 PC2.5 V400 diesel engines
- Speed: 25 knots (46 km/h; 29 mph)
- Range: 20,000 nmi (37,000 km; 23,000 mi)
- Sensors & processing systems: OPS-14 2D Air search; MS 1596 navigation radar; JMA 8303 surface search radar
- Armament: 1 × Bofors 40 Mk4 gun; 2 × JM61 20 mm guns
- Aircraft carried: 2 × Eurocopter AS332 or EC225
- Aviation facilities: Hangar and helipad

Shunkō (PLH-42) is a Shunkō-class patrol vessel currently operated by the Japanese Coast Guard.

== Construction and career ==
Shunkō was laid down on 15 February 2018 and launched on 20 March 2019 by Mitsubishi, Shimonoseki. She was commissioned on 19 February 2020.

== Gallery ==
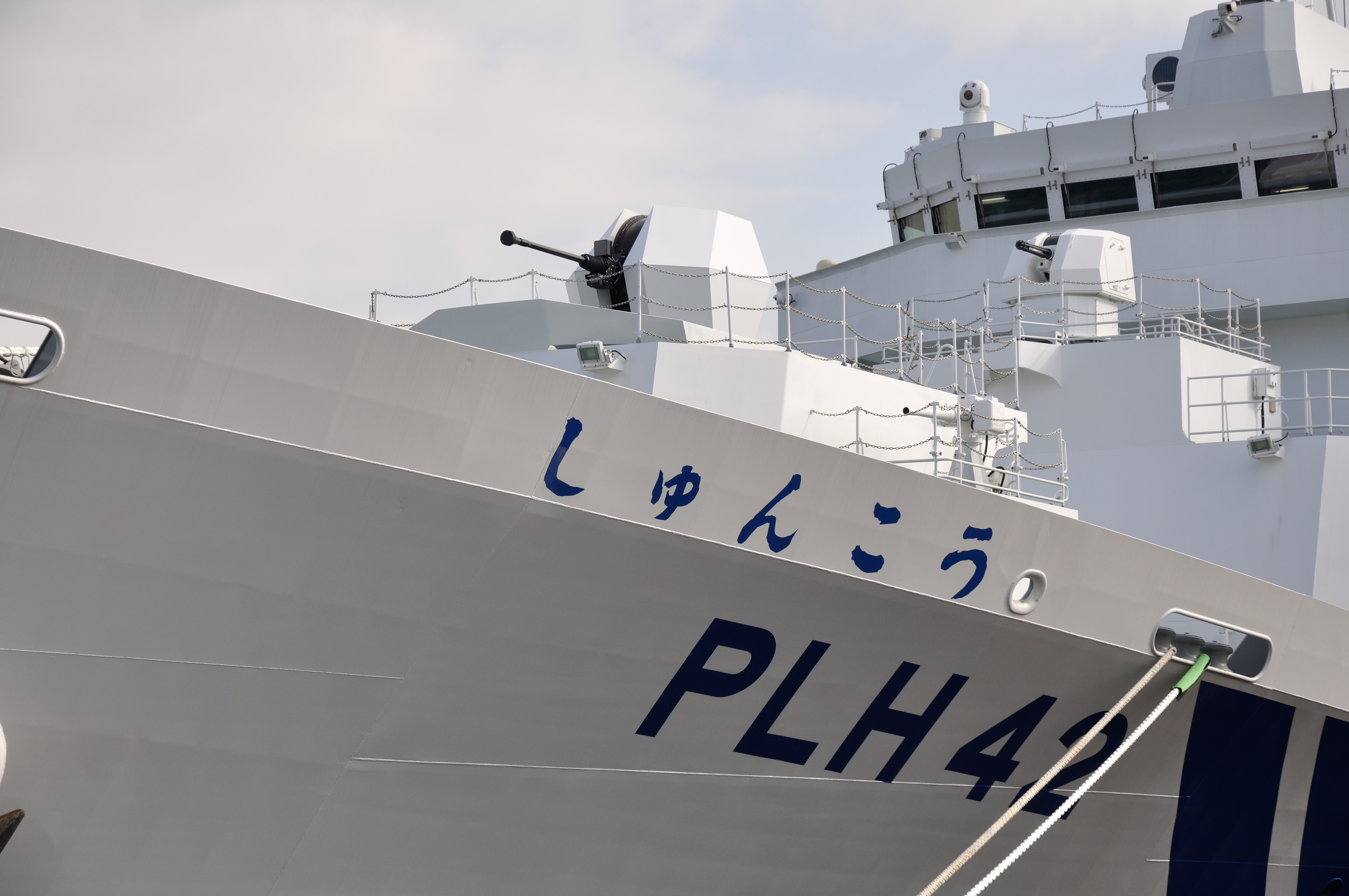
Shunkō on 4 February 2020
