= Asisguard Songar =

Turkish unmanned combat aerial vehicle

Songar

General information
- Type: Quadrotor unmanned armed aerial vehicle
- National origin: Turkey
- Manufacturer: Asisguard
- Status: In service
- Primary user: Turkish Armed Forces; Pakistan Armed Forces

History
- First flight: 2019

Songar is a low-altitude, quadrotor, unmanned combat aerial vehicle (UAEV) that was developed by Asisguard for the Turkish Armed Forces.

== Overview ==
Songar was developed by the Ankara-based defense-industry supplier Asisguard; it consists of a quadrotor UAEV, a ground-control station, and a set of ground-support equipment. It can be operated in autonomous and manual-flight modes. It features route-planning, autonomous flight, and autonomous return-to-base operation in critical battery-charge-level and data-link-disconnection situations. It can simultaneously transmit telemetry data and images. Songar was introduced at the 2019 International Defence Industry Fair (IDEF) in Istanbul.

Songar has an operational range of approximately 10 km (6.2 mi), and is equipped with both daylight and infrared cameras. It is fitted with several types of built-in weapons and can remotely destroy targets. It has the dimensions 65 cm × 62 cm × 75 cm (26 in × 24 in × 30 in) during transportation and 105 cm × 62 cm × 75 cm (41 in × 24 in × 30 in) during flight. The maximum takeoff weight (MTOW) when fully equipped and fully armed is 45 kg (99 lb) It can operate in a height above ground level of 400 m (1,300 ft) at a maximum elevation of 2,800 m (9,200 ft) above mean sea level. The drone is dust-resistant, complying with the IP Code 67 standard. It has Global Positioning System (GPS)-and Global Navigation Satellite System (GLONASS)-compatible navigation capability.

This system provides advantages because it is low-cost, can be developed according to needs, is easy to use, is light, and can be carried by personnel in multiple units. The first Songar drone was delivered to the Turkish Armed Forces in 2020, and was integrated into a tactical, 4x4, wheeled, armoured fighting vehicle. In November 2021, it was announced that Songar was being exported to two countries.

== Weapons ==
Songar includes an automatic gun stabilizer (OASIS), recoil damping and the ability of the barrel to be tilted in the 0-60° vertical axis, one pilot camera of 10x magnification and a gun camera, and a ground-control station (YKİ). The machine-gun version fires up to 200 5.56×45mm NATO rounds in adjustable burst mode of 15 rounds. The drone can continue its mission with the rounds magazine, which can be quickly changed with no special intervention. Simultaneous missions can be performed with a single or multiple drone system. The drone makes aerial reconnaissance of the threat/target area or location, destroys the target, performs post-operative damage assessment, and transmits real-time images.

The Songar Togan version, which is integrated with SAGE Togan—an air-dropped, unguided/low-profile guided, 81 mm mortar that was developed by TÜBİTAK SAGE—has a CEP value of 10 m (33 ft) and a blast radius of 35 m (115 ft).

Songar was initially equipped with an automatic machine gun. After entering into the service of the security forces, various weapon systems and ammunition were integrated. In March 2022, a Songar drone with a laser-guided, mini-missile system was tested. The drone can fire up six mini missiles of 170 mm (6.7 in) length with 40 mm (1.6 in) diameter that were developed by Troy Technology. It is intended to be operated in cross-border and residential area. The missiles are launched from 550 mm (22 in) long, single-use tubes. Each missile and its tube together weigh about 0.5 kg (1.1 lb). The mini-missile has a maximum distance of 2 km (1.2 mi) and an effective maximum range of 100–500 m (330–1,640 ft). The anti-personnel warhead with a smart fuse operates in a radius of 12 m (39 ft). The armor-piercing warhead's penetration capability corresponds to STANAG 4569 Level 2. Songar with mini-missile is used to destroy fixed targets such as unarmored and lightly armored vehicles, buildings, and small structures.

== Variants ==
- Songar MG, automatic machine gun
- Songar MG GL (T-40), automatic machine gun and grenade launcher
- Songar AK40-GL, automatic machine gun and grenade launcher
- Songar Togan, air-launched ballistic/near precision 81 mm mortar
- Songar APC, mounted on BMC Amazon vehicle
