= FGK =

FGK could refer to:

- FGK algorithm, an implementation of Adaptive Huffman coding
- FGK star, a grouping of star types in astronomy
- Field Gun Factory, Kanpur, a weapons manufacturing plant in Kanpur, Uttar Pradesh, India
