= Bren light machine gun =

Bren
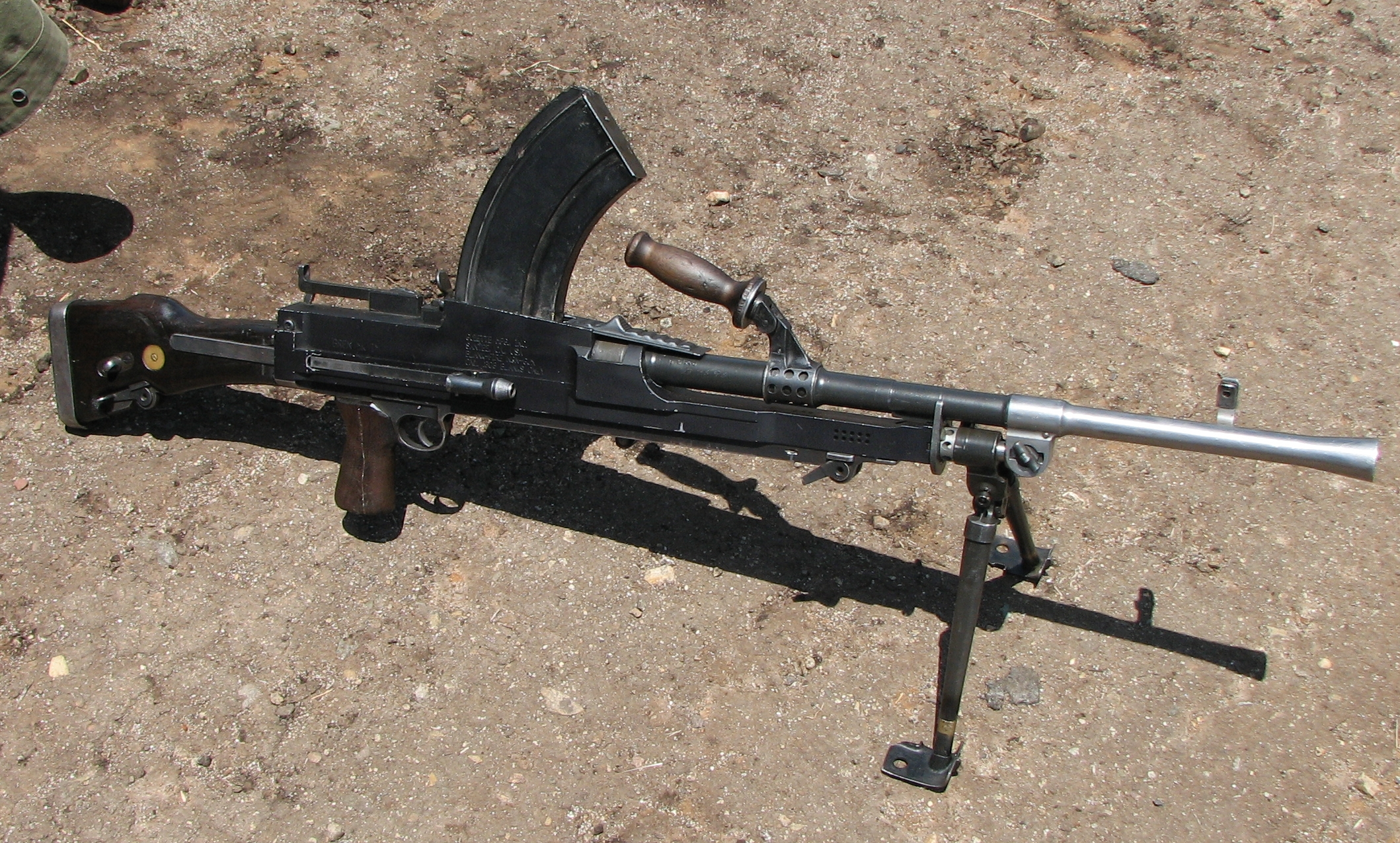
- A Bren Mk.1 gun
- Type: Light machine gun
- Place of origin: First Czechoslovak Republic (design); United Kingdom (manufacture)

Service history
- In service: 1938–2012
- Used by: See § Users
- Wars: See § Service

Production history
- Designer: Václav Holek
- Designed: 1935
- Manufacturer: Royal Small Arms Factory; John Inglis and Company; Lithgow Small Arms Factory; Rifle Factory Ishapore
- Unit cost: £40
- Produced: 1935–1971
- No. built: 500,000
- Variants: See § Variants

Specifications
- Mass: Mk1 & Mk2: 22.8 lb (10.3 kg), 25 lb (11.3 kg) loaded; Mk3 & Mk4: 19.15 lb (8.7 kg), 21.6 lb (9.8 kg) loaded
- Length: Mk1 & Mk2: 45.5 in (1,160 mm); Mk3 & Mk4: 42.9 in (1,090 mm)
- Barrel length: 25 in (635 mm)
- Crew: 2, gunner and assistant
- Cartridge: .303 British; 7.92×57mm Mauser (Note: Made for China in World War II.); .30-06 Springfield (Note: Made for Taiwan & Italy after World War II); 7.62×51mm NATO (Note: L4 series, Gun Machine 7.62mm 1B); 7.62×39mm (Note: Made for China after World War II)
- Action: Gas-operated, tilting bolt
- Rate of fire: 500–520 rounds/min; practical 120 rounds/min sustained
- Muzzle velocity: 2,440 ft/s (743.7 m/s)
- Effective firing range: 600 yd (550 m)
- Maximum firing range: 1,850 yd (1,690 m)
- Feed system: 30-round detachable box magazine; 100-round detachable pan magazine (.303 variants only); 20-round L1A1 SLR magazine (7.62 mm variants only)
- Sights: Iron

The Bren gun (Brno-Enfield) was a series of light machine guns (LMG) made by the United Kingdom in the 1930s and used in various roles until 1992. While best known for its role as the British and British Empire forces' primary infantry LMG in World War II, it was also used in the Korean War and saw service throughout the latter half of the 20th century, including the 1982 Falklands War. Although fitted with a bipod, it could also be mounted on a tripod or be vehicle-mounted.

The Bren gun was a licensed version of the Czechoslovak ZGB 33 light machine gun which, in turn, was a modified version of the ZB vz. 26, which British Army officials had tested during a firearms service competition in the 1930s. The designer was Václav Holek, a gun inventor and design engineer. The later Bren gun featured a distinctive top-mounted curved box magazine, conical flash hider, and quick change barrel.

In the 1950s, many Bren guns were re-barrelled to accept the 7.62×51mm NATO cartridge and modified to feed from the magazine for the L1 (Commonwealth version of the FN FAL) rifle as the L4 light machine gun. It was replaced in the British Army as the section LMG by the L7 general-purpose machine gun (GPMG), a belt-fed weapon. This was supplemented in the 1980s by the L86 Light Support Weapon firing the 5.56×45mm NATO round, leaving the Bren gun in use only as a pintle mount on some vehicles. The Bren gun was manufactured by Indian Ordnance Factories as the "Gun Machine 7.62mm 1B" before it was discontinued in 2012.

== Name ==
The name Bren was derived from Brno, the city in Czechoslovakia, where the Zb vz. 26 was designed (in the Zbrojovka Brno Factory) and Enfield, site of the British Royal Small Arms Factory.

== Development ==
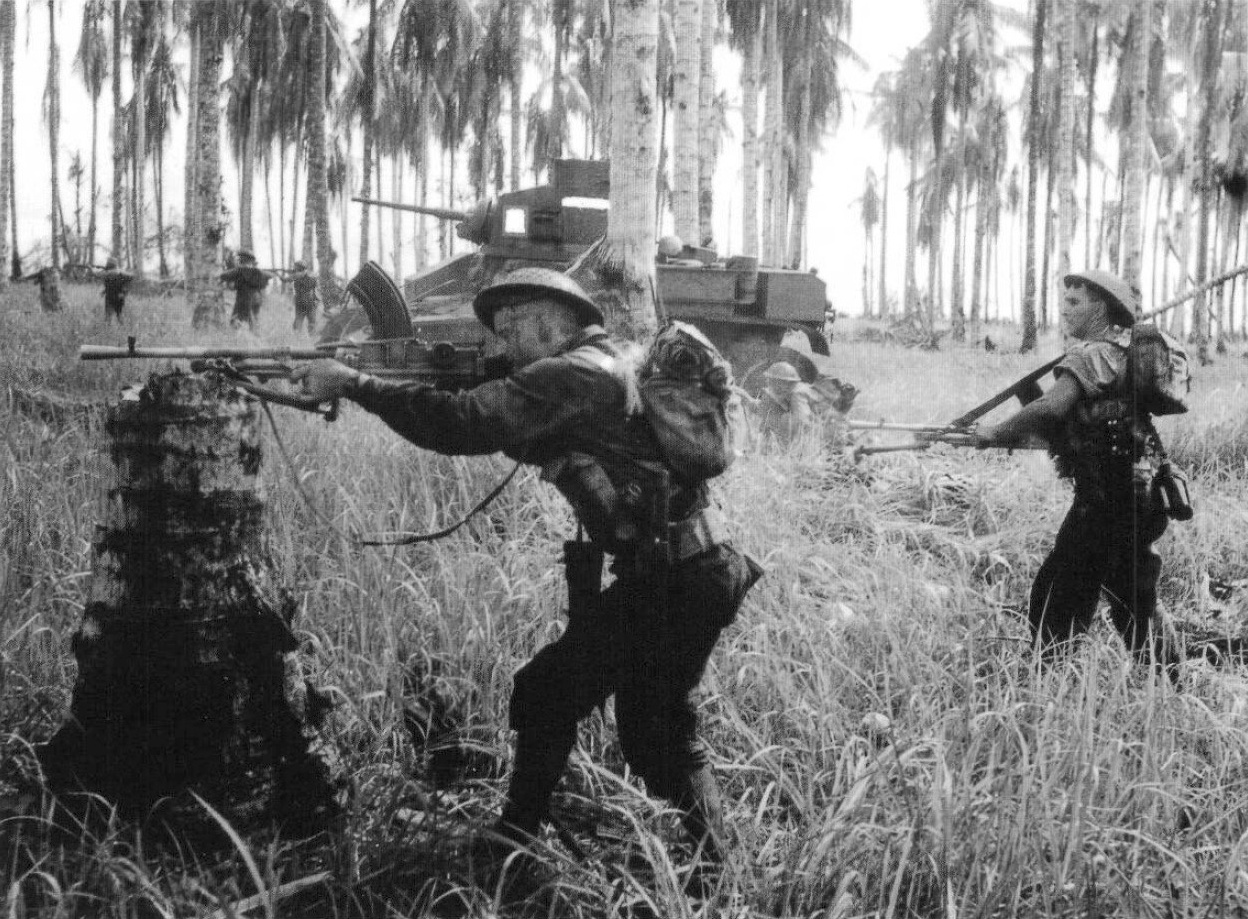
Australian assault on a pillbox at Giropa Point, Papua New Guinea, January 1943; the two soldiers in the foreground both carry Brens.

At the close of World War I in 1918, the British Army was equipped with two main automatic weapons; the Vickers medium machine gun (MMG) and the Lewis light machine gun. The Vickers was heavy and required a supply of water to keep it in operation, which tended to relegate it to static defence and indirect fire support. The Lewis, although lighter, was still heavy and was prone to frequent stoppages: its barrel could not be changed in the field, which meant that sustained firing resulted in overheating until it stopped altogether.

In 1922, to find a replacement for the Lewis, the Small Arms Committee of the British Army ran competitive trials between the Madsen machine gun, the M1918 Browning Automatic Rifle (BAR), the Hotchkiss M1909 machine gun, the Beardmore–Farquhar rifle, and the Lewis itself. Although the BAR was recommended, the sheer number of Lewis guns available and the difficult financial conditions meant that nothing was done. Various new models of light machine gun were tested as they became available, and in 1930, a further set of extensive trials commenced, overseen by Frederick Hubert Vinden. This time the weapons tested included the SIG Neuhausen KE7, the Vickers–Berthier and the Czechoslovak ZB vz. 27. The last did not meet high requirements for durability and reliability, mainly because gunpowder residue from British cordite was obstructing the gas tube (ZB vz. 27 was also sent in 7.92 Mauser instead of .303 British, but ZB already held a patent for a staggered magazine for rimmed rounds). The Vickers–Berthier was later adopted by the Indian Army because it could be manufactured at once, rather than wait for the British Lewis production run to finish; it too saw extensive service in World War II.

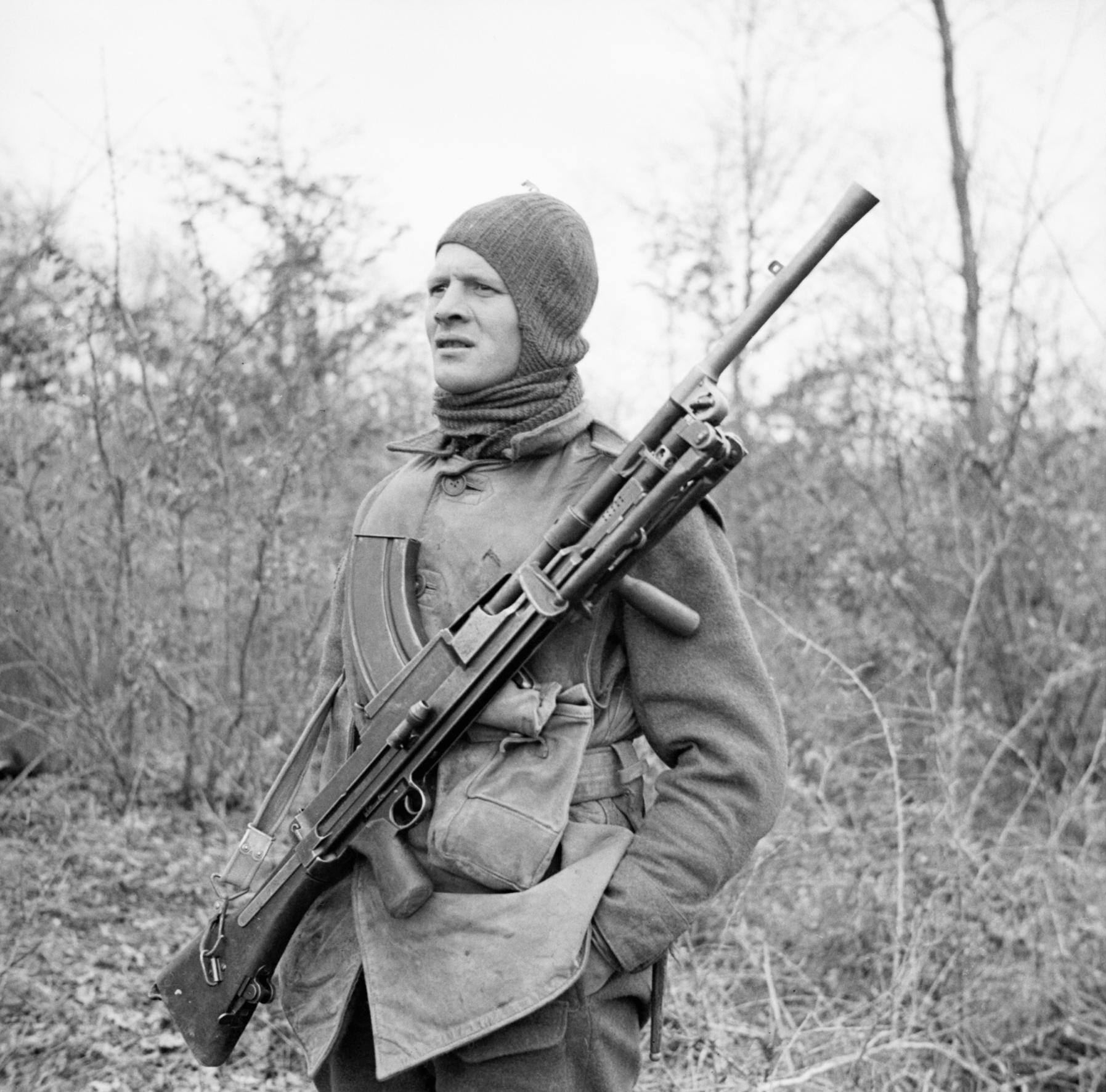
A member of No. 9 Commando at Anzio, equipped for a patrol with his Bren gun, 5 March 1944

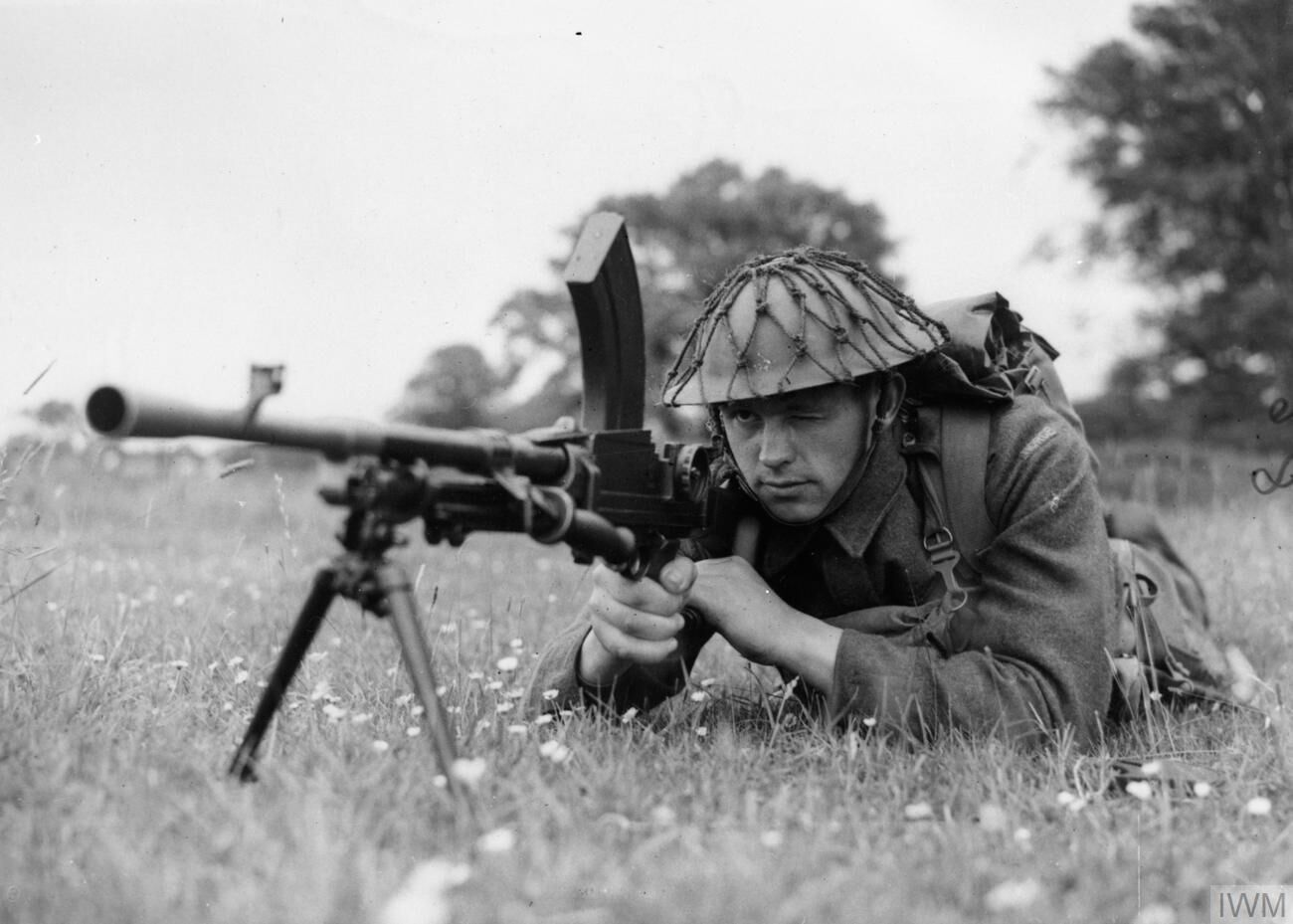
A Bren gunner of the Norwegian Brigade takes aim during training at Dumfries, Scotland, 27 June 1941.

A modified variant with a shortened gas tube was tested again in June 1932, and then newly developed ZB-30 in .303 yet again tested in November. Receiving more feedback and incorporating it into the design by January 1933, yet two other modifications were tested by British representatives in Brno in July. One of the variants was selected, designated ZGB 33 (for Zbrojovka, Great Britain, 1933), and 10 samples were sent to England in autumn 1933. After additional trials in early 1934, more samples were ordered during the summer of 1934, and on May 24, 1935, the licence for British manufacture was finally acquired, and the design was adopted under the Bren name.

The major changes were in the magazine and barrel and the lower pistol grip assembly which went from a swivelling grip frame pivoted on the front of the trigger guard to a sliding grip frame which included the forward tripod mount and sliding ejection port cover. The magazine was curved in order to feed the rimmed .303 inch SAA ("Small Arms Ammunition") cartridge, a change from the various rimless Mauser-design cartridges such as the 7.9-mm Mauser round previously used by Czech designs. These modifications were categorised in various numbered designations, ZB vz. 27, ZB vz. 30, ZB vz. 32, and finally the ZGB 33, which was licensed for manufacture under the Bren name.

The Bren was a gas-operated weapon using the same .303 ammunition as the standard British bolt-action rifle, the Lee–Enfield, firing at a rate between 480 and 540 rounds per minute (rpm), depending on the model. Propellant gases vented from a port towards the muzzle end of the barrel through a regulator (visible just in front of the bipod) with four quick-adjustment apertures of different sizes, intended to tailor the gas volume to different ambient temperatures (smallest flow at high temperature, e.g. summer desert, largest at low temperature, e.g. winter Arctic). The vented gas drove a piston which in turn actuated the breech block. Each gun came with a spare barrel that could be quickly changed when the barrel became hot during sustained fire, though later guns featured a chrome-lined barrel, which reduced the need for a spare. To change barrels, the release catch in front of the magazine was rotated to unlock the barrel. The carrying handle above the barrel was used to grip and remove the hot barrel without burning the hands.

The Bren was magazine-fed, which slowed its rate of fire and required more frequent reloading than British belt-fed machine guns such as the larger .303 Vickers machine gun. The slower rate of fire prevented more rapid overheating of the Bren's air-cooled barrel, and the Bren was much lighter than belt-fed machine guns, which typically had cooling jackets, often liquid filled. The magazines also prevented the ammunition from getting dirty, which was more of a problem with the Vickers with its 250-round canvas belts. The sights were offset to the left, to avoid the magazine on the top of the weapon. The position of the sights meant that the Bren could be fired only from the right shoulder.

== Service ==
=== World War II ===
==== Organization and issue ====
In the British and Commonwealth armies, the Bren was generally issued on a scale of one per rifle section. An infantry battalion also had a "carrier" platoon, equipped with Universal Carriers, each of which carried a Bren gun. Parachute battalions from 1944 had an extra Bren in the Anti-tank platoon. The 66-man "Assault Troop" of British Commandos had a nominal establishment of four Bren guns. Realising the need for additional section-level firepower, the British Army endeavoured to issue the Bren in great numbers, with a stated goal of one Bren to every four private soldiers.

The Bren was operated by a two-man crew, sometimes commanded by a Lance Corporal as an infantry section's "gun group", the remainder of the section forming the "rifle group". The gunner or "Number 1" carried and fired the Bren, and a loader or "Number 2" carried extra magazines, a spare barrel and a tool kit. Number 2 helped reload the gun and replace the barrel when it overheated, and spotted targets for Number 1. For a light machine gun of the interwar and early World War II era, the Bren was about average in weight. On long marches in non-operational areas it was often partially disassembled and its parts were carried by two soldiers. The top-mounted magazine vibrated and moved during fire, making the weapon more visible in combat, and many Bren gunners used paint or improvised canvas covers to disguise the prominent magazine.

A tripod mount with 42 degrees of traverse was available to allow the Bren to be used on "fixed lines" of fire for defensive shooting at pre-determined areas in the dark or if obscured by fog or smoke.

The Bren was also used on many vehicles, the Universal Carrier also known as the "Bren Gun Carrier", (Note: the name was a carryover from the "Carrier, Bren Gun" one of four variations of the tracked vehicle before the Universal design was developed) and on tanks and armoured cars. The Carrier was intended to use its "armour, speed and cross country performance" to bring the gun team into position from where it would fire dismounted; firing from the vehicle only in an emergency.

The Bren could not be used as a co-axial weapon on tanks, as the magazine restricted its depression and was awkward to handle in confined spaces, and it was therefore used on a pintle mount only. (The belt fed Vickers or Besa, the latter being another Czechoslovak machine gun design adopted by the British, were instead used as co-axial weapons.)

An unfortunate problem occurred when the Bren was fired from the Dingo Scout Car; the hot cartridge cases tended to be ejected down the neck of the driver, whose position was next to the pintle. A canvas bag was designed to catch the cartridges and overcome the problem, but it seems to have been rarely issued.

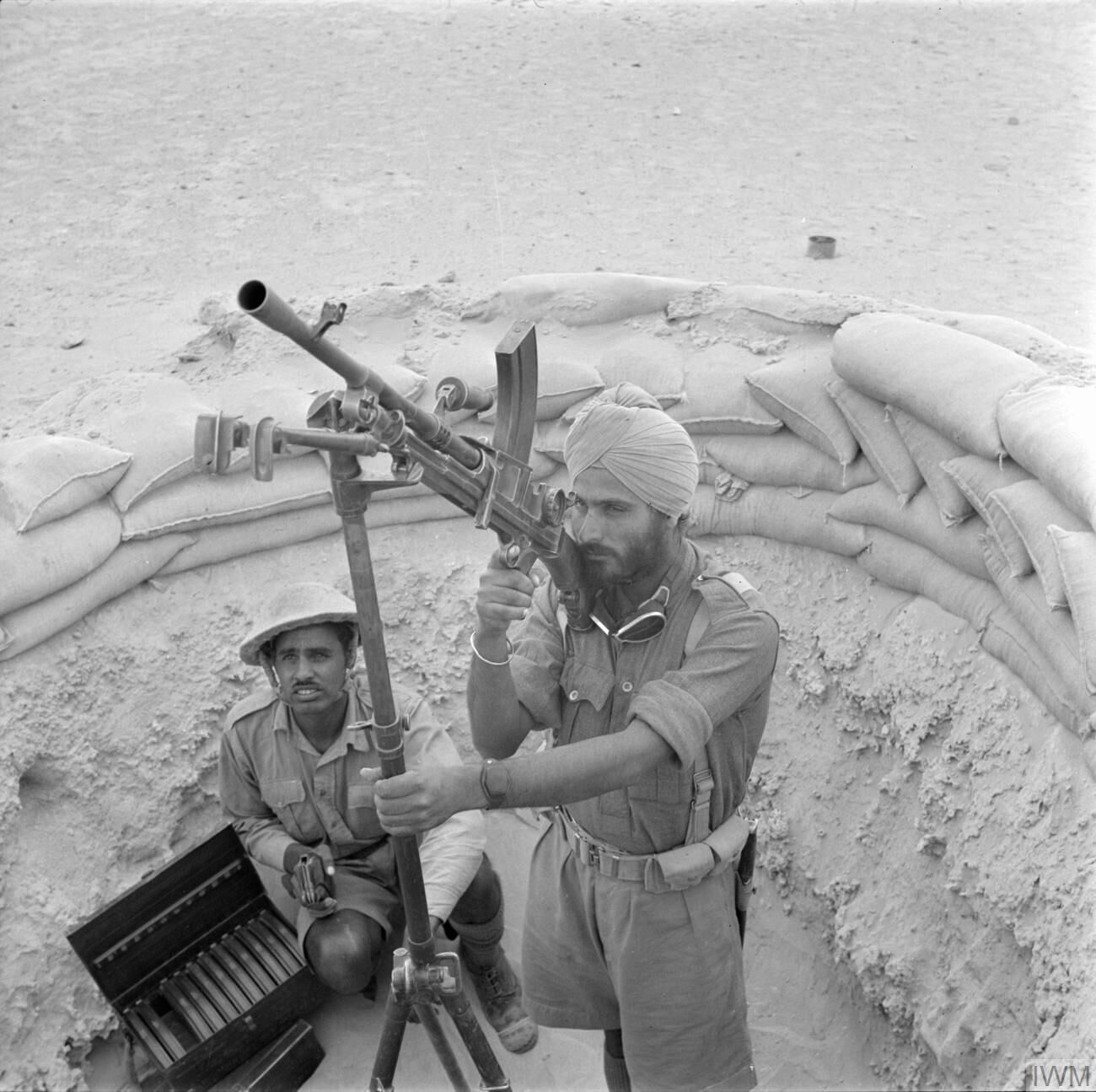
Indian troops man a Bren gun on an anti-aircraft tripod, Western Desert April 1941

The Bren was also employed in the anti-aircraft role with the tripod reconfigured for high angle fire. There were also several designs of less-portable mountings, including the Gallows and Mottley mounts. A 100-round pan magazine was available for the Bren for use in the anti-aircraft role.

==== Firing positions and assault use ====
The Bren was generally fired from the prone position using the attached bipod. On occasion, a Bren gunner would use his weapon on the move supported by a sling, much like an automatic rifle, and from standing or kneeling positions. Using the sling, Australian soldiers regularly fired the Bren from the hip, for instance in the marching fire tactic, a form of suppressive fire moving forward in assault. A Victoria Cross was awarded to Private Bruce Kingsbury for such use at Isurava, New Guinea, in 1942, during the Australians' fighting retreat from Kokoda.

Each British soldier's equipment normally included two magazines for his section's Bren gun. The large ammunition pouches on the 1937 pattern web equipment were designed around the Bren magazine. The Bren was regarded as the principal weapon of an infantry section, providing the majority of its firepower. As such, all ranks were expected to be "experts in its use". The Bren had an effective range of around 600 yards (550 m) when fired from a prone position with a bipod. (Note: The British Army training instructions gives 1000 yds as the effective range) It could deliver a beaten ground of 115 yd (105 m) by 12 m (39 ft) at 1,000 yd (910 m) on the bipod. A 'rapid' fire rate of 120 rounds per minute (four magazines a minute) was sustainable with a barrel change after ten magazines (or reduction in fire rate) to limit wear but doctrine was to fire in 4-5 round bursts. Soldiers were instructed to fire single-shot in imitation of rifle fire to conceal the presence of an automatic weapon.

==== Magazine loading and ejection ====
The 30-round magazine was in practice usually filled with 27 or 28 rounds to prevent jams and for magazines kept full for a long time 20 rounds to avoid wearing out the magazine spring. Care needed to be taken when loading the magazine to ensure that each round went ahead of the previous round, so that the .303 cartridge rims did not overlap the wrong way, which would cause a jam. The spent cartridge cases were ejected downwards, which was an improvement on the Lewis gun, which ejected sideways, since the glint of them flying through the air could compromise a concealed firing position.

==== Reliability and field reputation ====
In general, the Bren was considered a reliable and effective light machine gun, though in North Africa it was reported to jam regularly unless kept very clean and free of sand or dirt.

It was popular with British troops, who respected its reliability and combat effectiveness. The quality of the materials used would generally ensure minimal jamming. When the gun did jam through fouling caused by prolonged firing, the operator could adjust the four-position gas regulator to feed more gas to the piston increasing the power to operate the mechanism.

The barrel needed to be unlocked and slid forward slightly to allow the regulator to be turned. It was even said that all problems with the Bren could simply be cleared by hitting the gun, turning the regulator or doing both. It was "by general consent the finest light machine gun in the world of its period, and the most useful weapon provided to the (French) "maquis" ... accurate up to 1,000 meters, and (it) could withstand immense maltreatment and unskilled use. "Resistants" were constantly pleading for maximum drops of Brens".

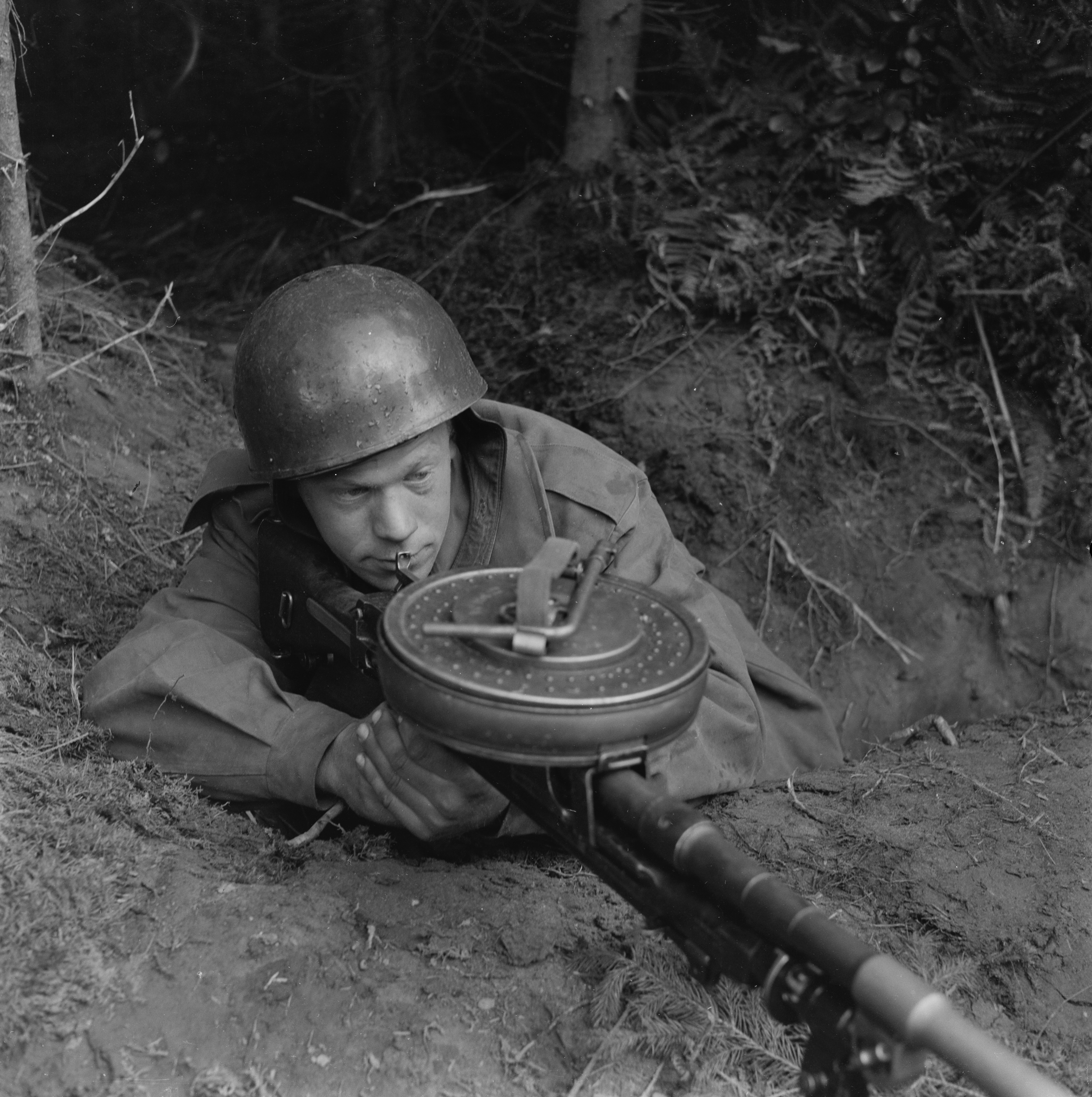
Bren with 100 round detachable pan magazine fitted; it prevented the original sights being used.

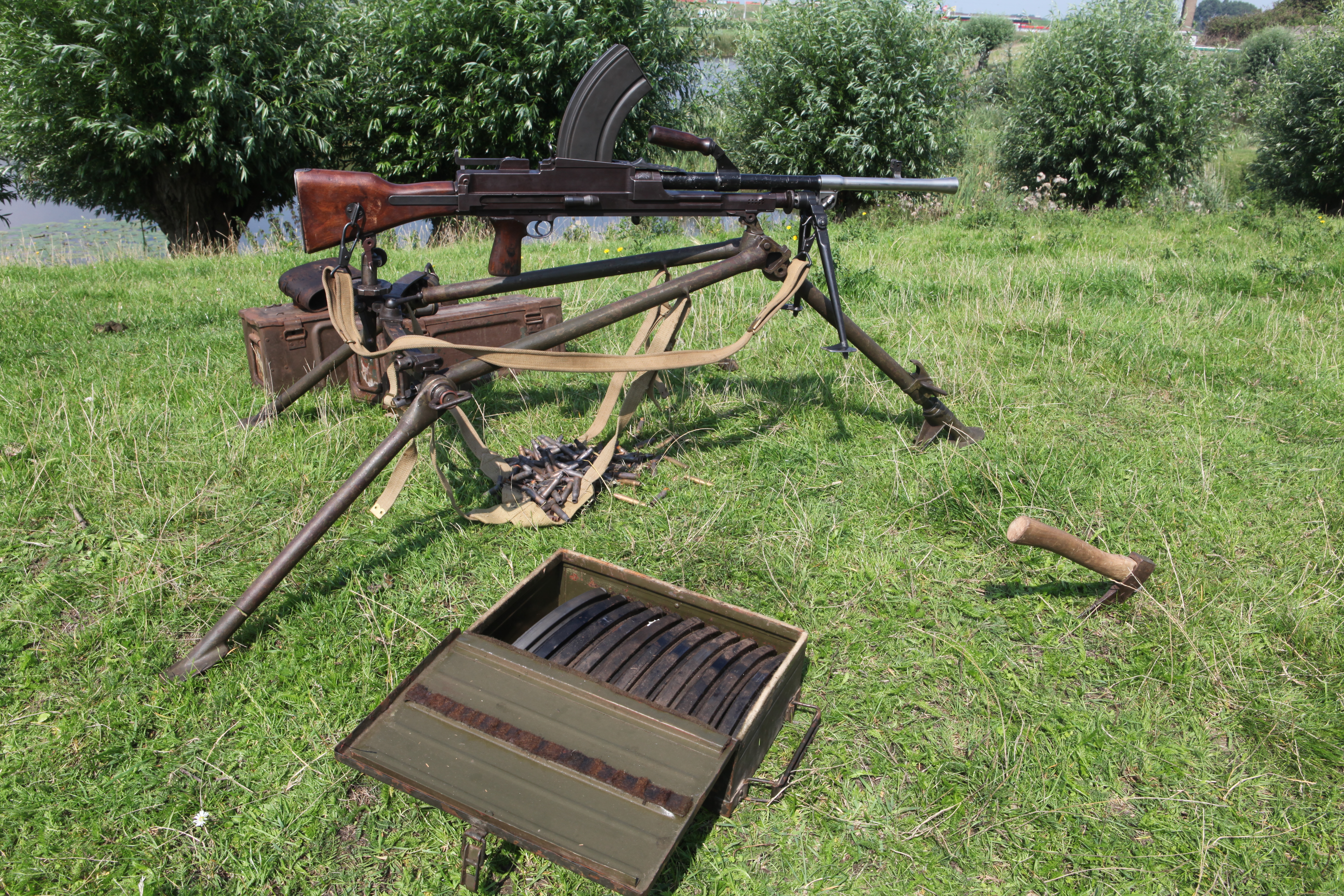
Bren gun mounted on a tripod

==== Related weapons and international service ====
The Bren's direct ancestor, the Czechoslovak ZB vz. 26, was also used in World War II by German and Romanian forces, including units of the Waffen SS. Many 7.92 mm ZB light machine guns were shipped to China, where they were employed first against the Japanese in World War II, and later against UN forces in Korea, including British and Commonwealth units.

Some ex-Chinese Czech ZB weapons were also in use in the early stages of the Vietnam War. Production of a 7.92 mm round model for the Far East was carried out by Inglis of Canada. The Bren was also delivered to the Soviet Union as part of the lend-lease program.

=== Post-war ===
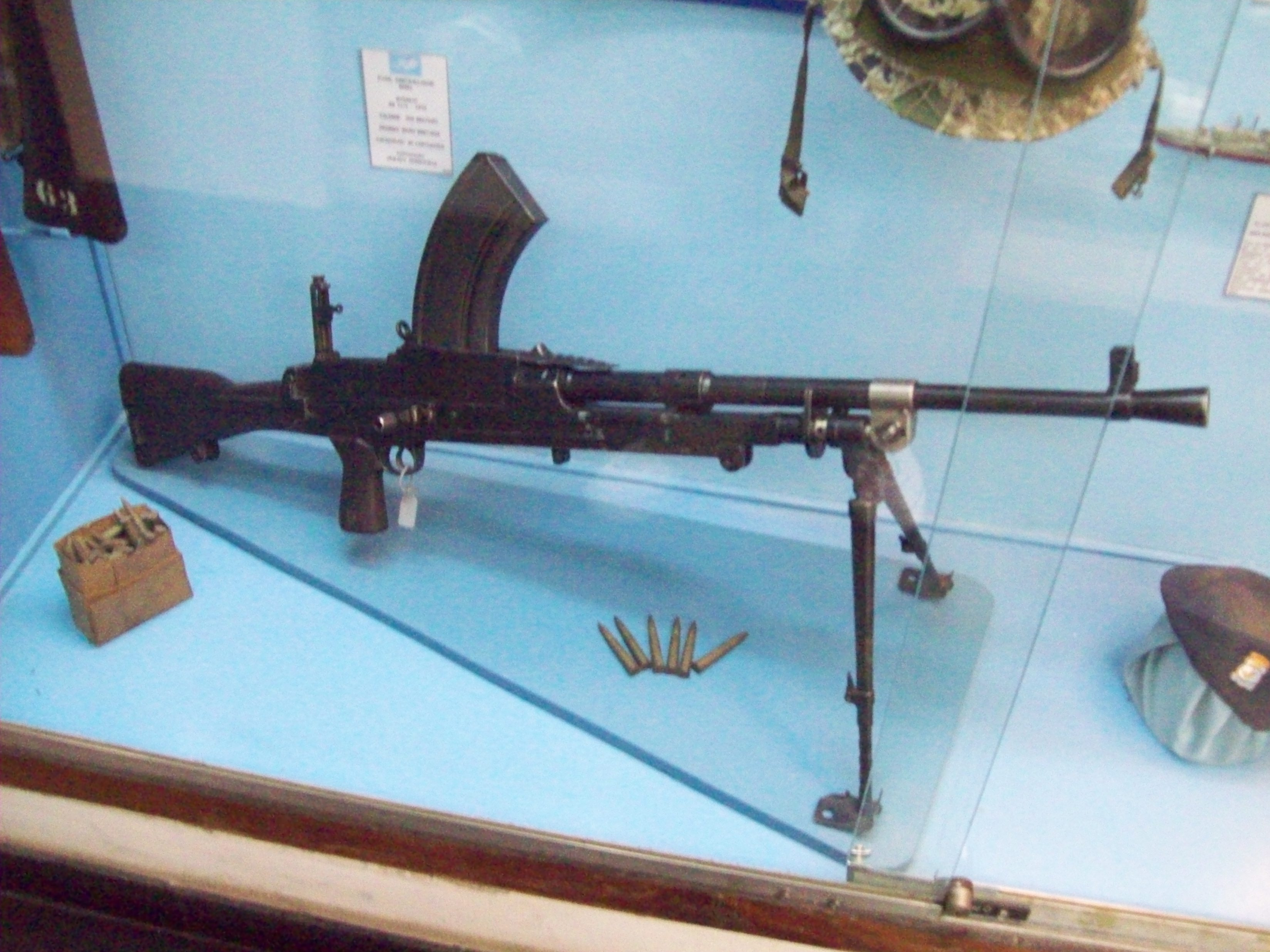
Bren gun in an Argentine museum

The British Army, and the armies of various countries of the Commonwealth, used the original Bren in the Korean War, the Malayan Emergency, the Mau Mau Uprising, the Suez Crisis, and the Cyprus Emergency. When Britain then adopted the 7.62 mm NATO cartridge, a version of the weapon adapted for said cartridge was issued as the "L4 light machine gun" (in various sub-versions) and first saw major use during the Aden Emergency and the Indonesia–Malaysia confrontation; during the latter deployment, the L4 was preferred to its replacement, the belt-fed L7 GPMG, on account of its lighter weight and of the GPMG's belts having a tendency to snag on vegetation. The L4 was also used on vehicle pintle mounts, though as time went by fewer and fewer vehicles would actually have the weapon mounted. During the Troubles, the L4A4 tended to be the section machine gun in use instead of the L7 GPMG, though both weapons did not see much use since the preference was for sections equipped solely with rifles.

Royal Marine Commando sections operating in Arctic conditions were issued with the L4A4 over the L7 GPMG since the ammunition belts used with the latter tended to catch snow and freeze up; then, during the Falklands War in 1982, both weapons were issued simultaneously so that Royal Marine units deploying to the Falklands could have two machine guns per section. The Bren's final operational deployment with the British Army, on a limited scale, was in the First Gulf War in 1991; by then, the 5.56mm NATO L86 LSW was replacing both it and the L7 GPMG, though the last L4 Brens would not be withdrawn until February 1999. Cadet Force usage of the various Brens would last even longer, with the last two weapons only being handed over to the Warminster Small Arms School in 2002.

The Mark III Bren remained in limited use with the Army Reserve of the Irish Defence Forces until 2006, when the 7.62 mm GPMG replaced it. The Bren was popular with the soldiers who fired it (known as Brenners) as it was light and durable, and had a reputation for accuracy. The most notable use of the Bren by Irish forces was in the Congo Crisis during the 1960s, when the Bren was the regular army's standard section automatic weapon.

Bren guns were in service with the Rhodesian Security Forces during the Rhodesian Bush War, including a substantial number re-chambered for 7.62 mm cartridges similar to those examples in the British Army. The Rhodesian Bren guns continued to see frequent action until the 1970s, when they were largely replaced by the FN MAG. A few were captured and re-issued by the Zimbabwe People's Revolutionary Army (ZIPRA). Some examples were still in service with reservists of the British South Africa Police in 1980, and were inherited by the Zimbabwe Republic Police upon the country's internationally recognised independence. Zimbabwean policemen continued to deploy Bren guns during operations against ZIPRA dissidents throughout the early 1980s.

The South African Defence Force deployed Bren guns during the South African Border War alongside the more contemporary FN MAG as late as 1978.

== Variants ==
Although they were generally well-liked, the high cost of £40 each gun was an issue for the British Army leadership. This became a greater issue when it was discovered that only 2,300 of the 30,000 Bren guns issued to the British Expeditionary Force came back to the United Kingdom after the defeat of France.

As the result, cost savings and increased rate of production became two main goals for subsequent variant designs. The Bren Mk II design simplified production by replacing the drum rear sight with a ladder design, making the bipod legs non-adjustable, simplifying the gun butt, reducing the use of stainless steel, among other steps that reduced the cost by 20% to 25%; Mk II was approved in September 1940 and entered production in 1941.

While the Bren Mk III design also aimed at reducing cost, it also had the concurrent goal of being lightened for jungle warfare; the final product weighed 19 lb 5 oz (8.8 kg), 3 pounds lighter than the original Bren Mk I design; it was standardised in July 1944 and saw a production of 57,600.

Also standardised in July 1944 was the Bren Mk IV, which was further lightened to 19 lb 2 oz (8.7 kg); however, it did not enter production until July 1945, and only 250 were built before the end of the war. While Enfield was able to produce only 400 Bren Mk I guns each month, with the various simplification efforts production numbers rose to 1,000 guns per week by 1943. Later designs of production Bren guns featured chrome-lined barrels that offered less resistance, preventing overheating and reducing the need for quick changes of barrels.

=== Mark 1 ===
Introduced September 1937; the original Czechoslovak designed ZGB 33. Overall length 45.5 inches (1.16 m), 25 inches (0.64 m) barrel length. Weight 22 lb 2 oz (10.0 kg).

Features:

- Drum-pattern rear aperture sight
- Buttstrap for use over-the-shoulder when firing
- Rear grip under butt
- Telescoping bipod
- Folding cocking handle

An Enfield-made .303 Bren Mk 1 was converted to 7.92mm in 1938 due to the suggestion of a possibility of a British Army change over to a rimless cartridge for machine guns being mooted. (Note: The 7.92mm was the cartridge that the original Zb 27 and Zb 30 supplied to the United Kingdom for testing had been chambered in. Guns made at BRNO chambered to .303 for the British trials were designated 'ZGB 30' at a cost of £175 per-gun with two barrels and with spares and accessories. Further British requests for modifications led to the ZGB 32, ZGB 33, and ZGB 34, the last being accepted for production as the Bren with the first Enfield production gun being completed in September 1937.)

=== Mark 2 ===
Introduced 1941. A simplified version of the Mk1 more suited to wartime production with original design features subsequently found to be unnecessary deleted. (Note: A number of features present in the original pre-war design were found to be seldom if-ever used in action. For example, the then-current continental fashion of holding the gun placed the firer's free left hand under the butt, whereas British practice was to place the firer's free hand on top of the butt stock thus making the rear grip superfluous.) Produced by Inglis of Canada and the Monotype Group through a number of component manufacturing factories. Sometimes known as the "Garage hands" model. Overall length 45.5 inches (1.16 m), 25 inches (0.64 m) barrel length. Weight 23 lb 3 oz (10.5 kg).

Features:

- Folding-leaf rear sight
- Buttstrap deleted
- Rear grip deleted
- Fixed height bipod
- Fixed cocking handle

The Bren Mk2 was much simplified in the body, which although still being milled from a solid billet of steel, required significantly fewer milling operations than the Mk 1, resulting in a much cleaner appearance. The bipod was simplified in design as well as not having extending legs. Most Mk2 bipods resembled a simple A-frame and were more 'soldier proof'. The Mk2 also featured a slightly higher rate of fire than the Mk 1.

The woodwork on the Mk2 was simplified by being less ornate and ergonomic, which sped up the manufacturing process. The barrel was also simplified by means of a non-stepped removable flash hider and, in some cases, a barrel fore-end that was matte instead of highly polished. The buffered buttplate of the Mk1 was omitted and replaced with a sheet metal buttplate.

The Inglis version of the Bren Mk 2 chambered for the .30-06 (7.62 mm) cartridge and known as the M41 was also manufactured in Taiwan after the end of the Chinese Civil War.

=== Mark 3 ===
A shorter and lighter Bren made by Enfield from 1944 for the war in the East and for Airborne Forces. This was similar to the Mk2 but with the lightweight features of the early Mk1, with the main distinguishing feature being a shorter barrel and serrated area in front of the barrel nut. Overall length 42.9 in (1.09 m), 22.25 in (0.565 m) barrel length. Weight 19 lb 5 oz (8.8 kg).

=== Mark 4 ===
As with the Mk3 but this was a conversion of a Mk2. Overall length 42.9 in (1.09 m), 22.25 in (0.565 m) barrel length. Weight 19 lb 2 oz (8.7 kg).

=== .280 in Bren ===
Intended for use alongside the intermediate cartridge EM-2 rifle (briefly in service as the "Rifle, No.9, Mk.1") , a number of Bren guns (mostly Inglis-produced Mk 2s with 7.92mm Mauser breech blocks) were converted to fire the rimless .280 British ammunition. They could use either the twenty-round magazine from the EM-2 or a new thirty-round magazine. Both these conversions and the accompanying EM-2 fell through after US-driven standardization within NATO on the larger 7.62×51mm NATO round.

=== L4 ===
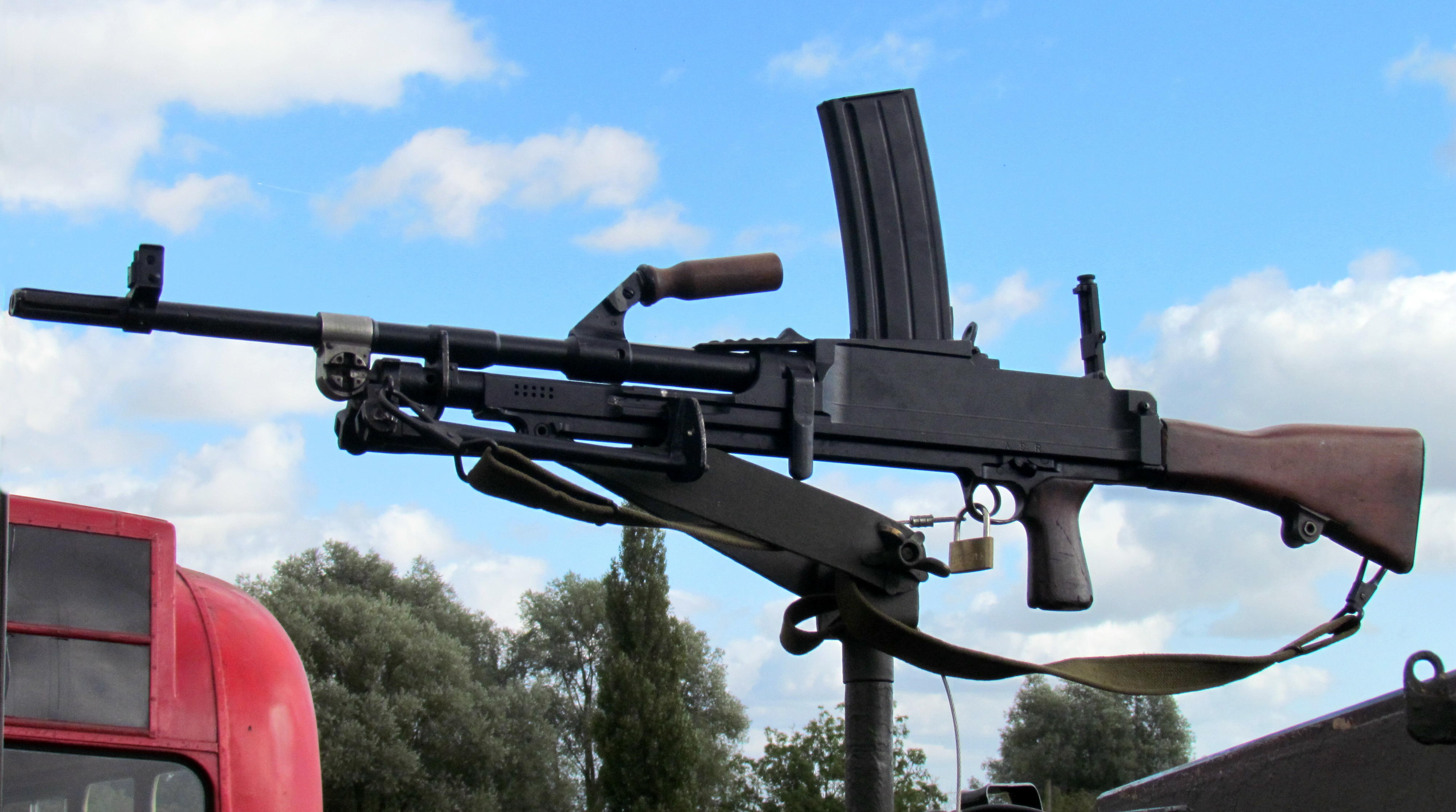
Pintle-mounted L4A1 Bren with distinctive flash hider and magazine.

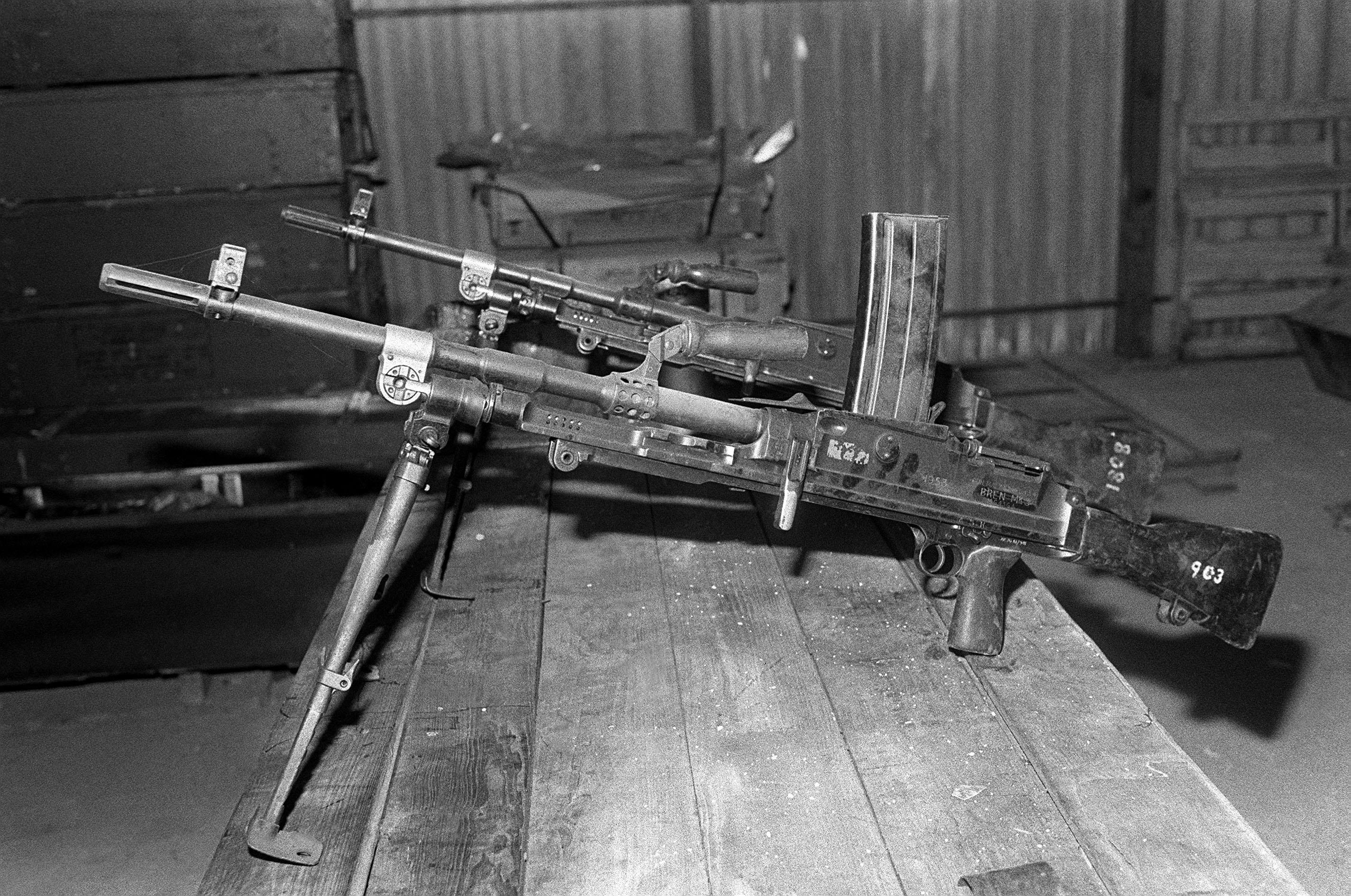
L4-series Brens captured from the Grenadian military during the 1983 United States invasion of Grenada. The circular plates below the magazine and the obliterated "BREN Mk 3" marking make these out to be the L4A2 variant or the later L4A4.

After the adoption of the 7.62mm NATO round and the L1A1 SLR variant of the FN FAL Britain briefly considered adopting an automatic rifle version of the FAL. Testing of this "X8" version was seen to prove that the same task could be done more efficiently (and at a lower cost) by converting Brens to 7.62mm NATO instead. After some initial test conversions, what would become known as the L4 series began being fielded from 1955 onwards. L4 Brens can easily be identified by their straighter (but still slightly curved) magazine and the replacement of the original flash hider with a slotted, cylindrical model (similar to that used on the L1A1 and the L7 GPMG), with some weapons additionally having red flashes on the receiver and the barrel to denote the calibre change. The thirty-round L4 magazine was interchangeable with the L1A1 SLR's twenty-round magazine, and the L4 could also take the thirty-round magazine from the Australian L2A1 and Canadian C2A1 automatic rifle versions of the SLR. The L4 remained in British service until the 1990s.

L4 designations
Designation	Description
L4A1	Bren Mk3 conversion originally known as X10E1, with Mk1 bipod and two steel barrels. Some 1,500 guns were converted; an oversight meant that the gun could accept magazines from the original FN FAL but not the later L1A1.
L4A2	Bren Mk3 conversion originally known as X10E2, with lightened bipod and two steel barrels. Circular body inserts on this and subsequent versions provided improved support to the magazine lips. This version could accept L1A1 magazines as originally intended. Some 7,600 guns were converted.
L4A3	Bren Mk2 conversion, similar characteristics to the L4A2.
L4A4	L4A2 variant with one chromium-plated steel barrel. (Note: The chromium-plated barrel had improved wear characteristics at high temperatures and so carrying a spare barrel was unnecessary.) 6,900 guns were converted by changing the barrels of existing L4A2s, while another 500 guns were entirely new conversions. The L4A4 was the last major version in British service.
L4A5	L4A3 variant with one chromium-plated steel barrel for the Royal Navy.
L4A6	L4A1 variant with one chromium-plated steel barrel.
L4A7	Conversion of MK1 Bren. Did not get past the prototype stage.
L4A8, L4A9	Variants with sight brackets for anti-aircraft and night-vision sights, implemented as an emergency measure after a heliborne PIRA bomb attack. Only the L4A9 version appears to have materialised, and then only in small numbers.

=== Drill purpose variants ===
The L54A1 was a drill purpose (DP) version of the various .303 Bren guns. It was mostly used by the Cadet Forces since these continued to use .303 Brens even after the Armed Forces proper had adopted the L4 Brens and the L7 GPMG. The L55A1 was the corresponding version of the L4 series.

=== Besal gun ===
The Besal, or Faulkner, light machine gun was a Bren-inspired emergency design developed in the aftermath of the French campaign and the evacuation from Dunkirk in which the British Expeditionary Force lost almost 30,000 Brens and given the vulnerability of a single, well known, manufacturing site for the Bren at Royal Small Arms Factory Enfield. Developed in 1940 by Harry Faulker of the Birmingham Small Arms Company, the Besal looks much like a Bren, but was developed with much simplified machining operations in mind to allow it to be produced in any machine shop. Unlike the Bren, the Besal was full automatic only rather than select fire and lacked a cocking handle, using the pistol grip instead. In Mark 2 format the Besal had no interchangeable parts with the Bren, but was designed to use Bren magazines.

=== Taden gun ===
The Taden gun was a post-war development of the Bren to use with the .280 British (7 mm) intermediate round proposed to replace the .303 in British service. The Taden was belt-fed with either spade grips for MMG use or a buttstock and pistol grip for LMG use and would have replaced both the Bren and the Vickers machine gun. Although reliable it was not accepted due to the US-driven standardization within NATO on the larger 7.62×51mm NATO round.

=== X11 ===
The X11 was a belt-fed Bren derivative developed by RSAF Enfield after the cancellation of the EM-2 rifle and Taden machine gun, adapting the Taden concepts to a Bren derived weapon in the new 7.62x51mm NATO standard round. It came second in trials behind the FN MAG.

=== Semiautomatic Bren guns ===
Many nations' militaries have disposed of their Bren guns as surplus to their needs. Surplus Brens have been imported to the United States for sale to collectors, but due to US gun laws restricting the importation of automatic weapons such guns must be legally destroyed by cutting up the receivers. A number of US gunsmiths have manufactured new semiautomatic Brens by welding the pieces of destroyed receivers back together, with modifications to prevent the use of full automatic parts, and fitting new fire-control components capable of only semiautomatic fire. The balance of the parts are surplus Bren parts. Such "semiautomatic machine guns" are legally considered rifles under US Federal law and the laws of most states.

== Production ==
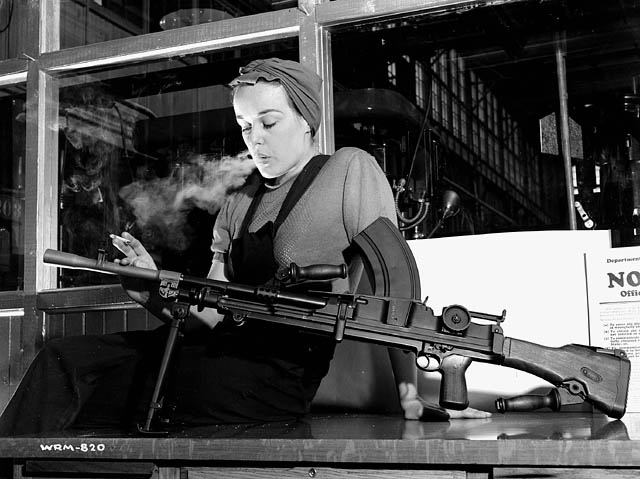
Veronica Foster as "Ronnie, the Bren Gun Girl", was a Canadian icon for women working in war production

Bren guns were produced at the Royal Small Arms Factory, in Enfield, London. The first Bren guns were built in September 1937, and by December, a total of 42 had been produced. Weekly production was 300 Brens a week in July 1938, and 400 a week in September 1939. The Monotype Group (Note: A consortium of Monotype, Daimler, Hercules Cycle, Climax Rock Drill, F. Tibbenham, British Fabricating Machine Co. and Sigmund Pumps) produced Mark 2 Brens. Enfield produced a total of 220,000 Mark I Bren guns, 57,600 in Mark III, and 250 in Mark IV.

John Inglis and Company received a contract from the British and Canadian governments in March 1938 to supply 5,000 Bren machine guns to the UK and 7,000 Bren machine guns to Canada. Both countries shared the capital costs of bringing in this new production facility. Production started in 1940; by August 1942, the Inglis plant was averaging 10,000 Brens per month, and produced 186,000 Bren guns of all variants by the end of the war, including 43,000 chambered in 7.92×57mm Mauser for export to the Chinese National Revolutionary Army.

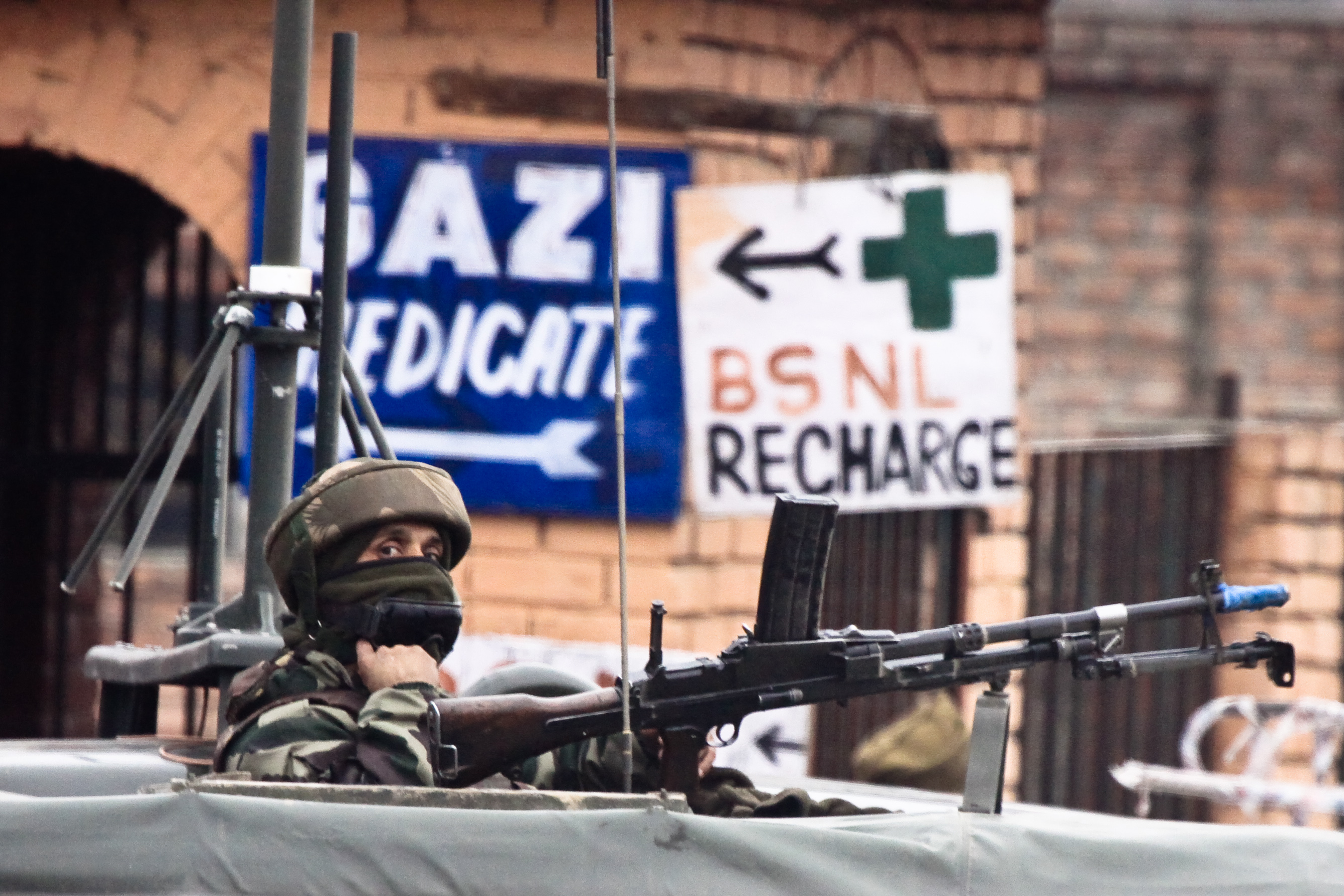
Indian soldier armed with domestically produced 7.62mm Bren (Gun Machine 7.62mm 1B), 2009.

In 1942, the Ishapore Arsenal began to produce Bren guns, and continued to do so long after the end of World War II, also manufacturing variants in 7.62×51mm NATO. A shadow factory for Ishapore was set up at Kanpur and produced .303 Brens before it was later rechambered to fire 7.62 NATO ammo in 1964 as the 1A LMG. Many of the Bren guns produced at Ishapore went to Indian troops, who had lost a great number of automatic weapons during the disastrous campaigns against the Japanese in Malaya and Burma; 17th Indian Infantry Division, for example, found itself with only 56 Bren guns after fleeing out of Burma in 1942.

Prior to the end of manufacturing, the Bren was made in India as the 1B.

In 1940, the Lithgow Small Arms Factory in New South Wales began to manufacture Bren guns, producing a total of 17,249 by 1945.

== Users ==
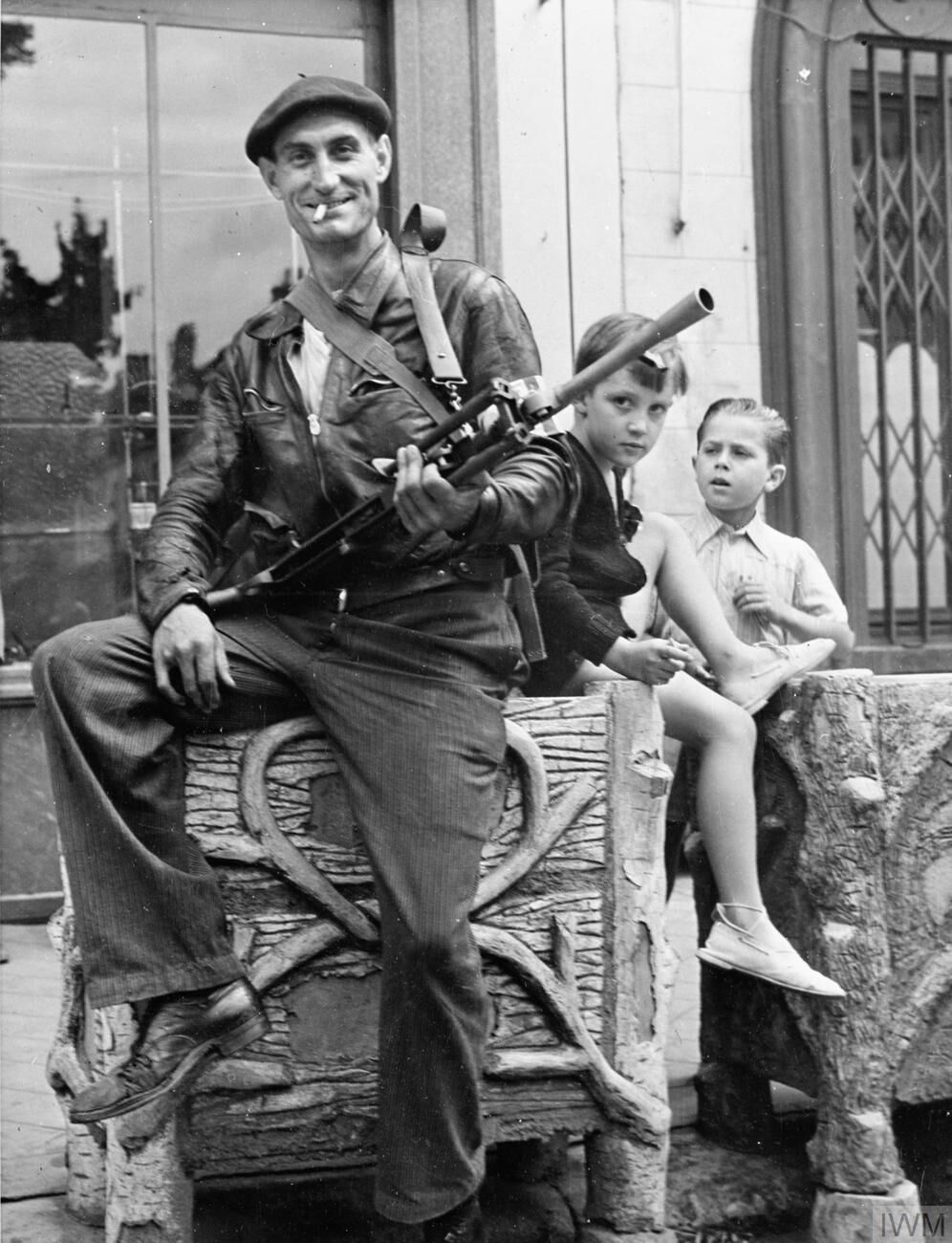
Watched by two small boys, a fighter from the French Forces of the Interior poses with his Bren in Châteaudun, 1944.

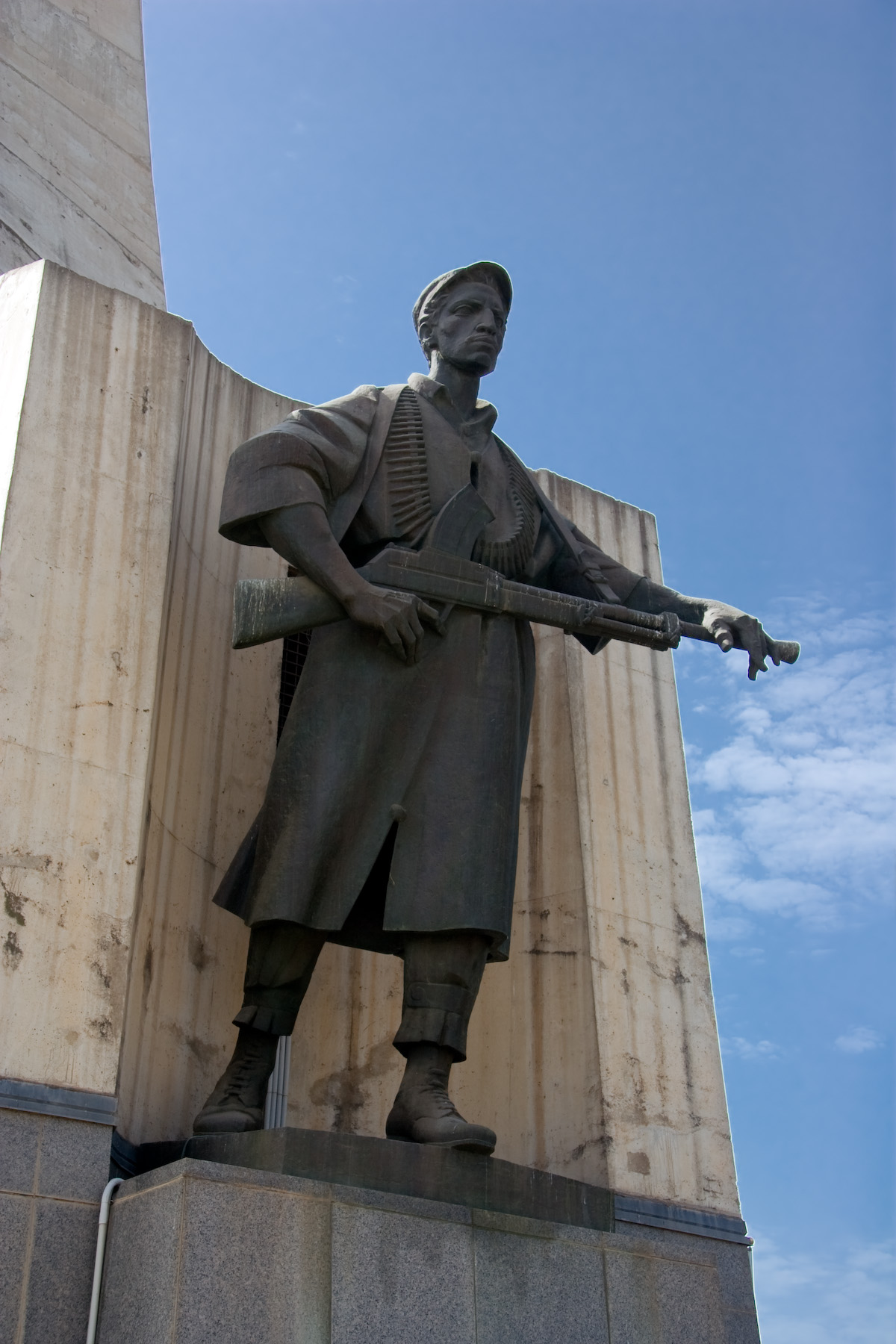
A statue at the Algerian Martyrs' Memorial portraying a soldier with a Bren.

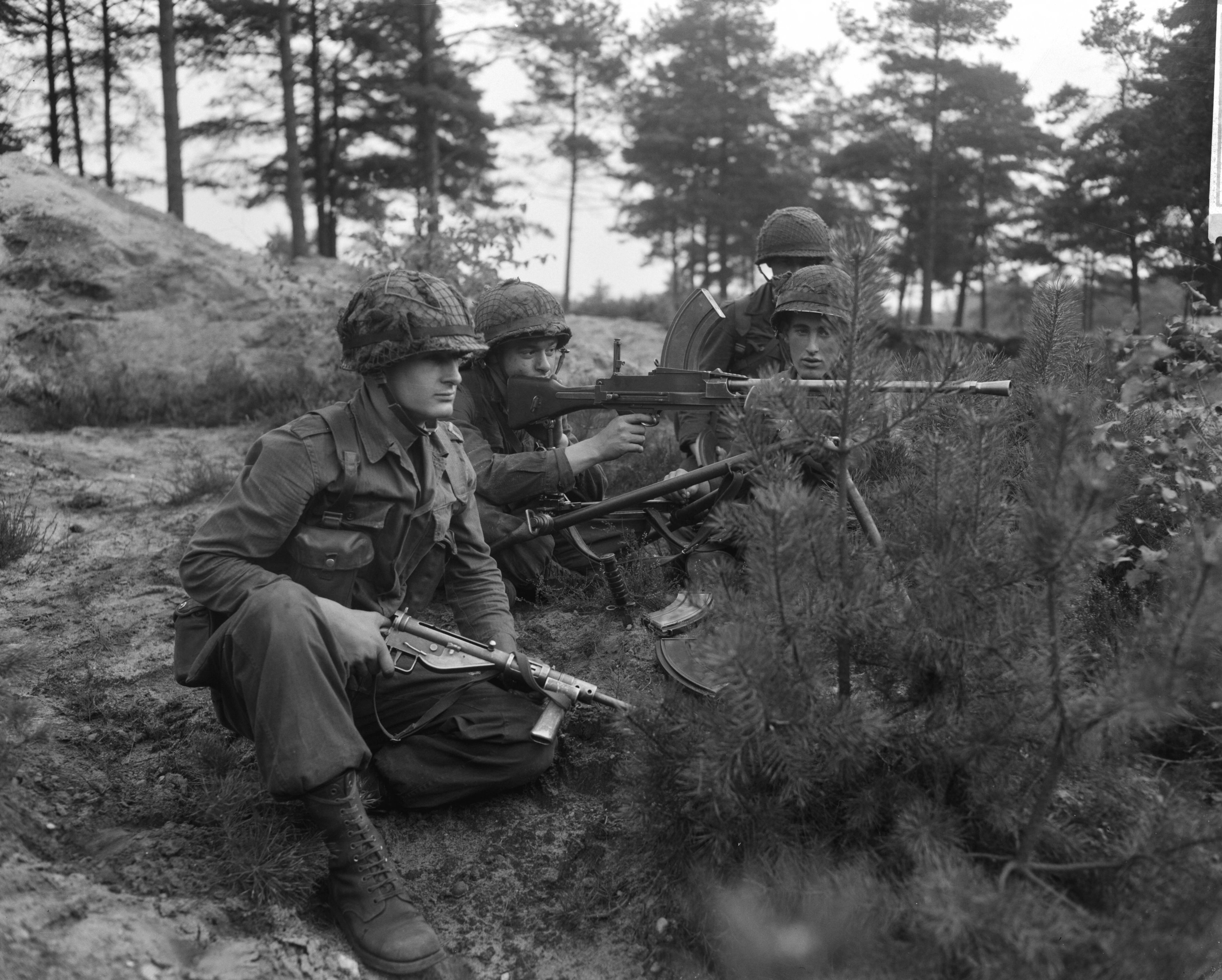
Dutch soldiers prepare a Bren machine gun position during an exercise, 1961.

- Algeria: National Liberation Army received 500 Brens from Egypt
- Australia: during World War II and Korean War. Indonesia–Malaysia confrontation (as L4A4). Continued in limited service until about the time of the general introduction of the F88 Steyr (circa 1990).
- Bangladesh
- Barbados
- Belize
- Belgium: post-war
- Biafra
- Botswana
- Canada
- Chadian FROLINAT
- Central African Republic: used by Gendarmerie and Republican Guard
- Croatia: Mark 2 version known to be used in the Croatian War of Independence.
- People's Republic of China: Many guns captured from Kuomintang. Used during Korean War. Some converted to fire 7.62x39 caliber ammunition from ammo supplied by their Soviet allies. They used regular AK-47 magazines.
- Republic of China: used by National Revolutionary Army 43,000 guns produced in 7.92×57mm Mauser by Inglis in Canada. Later in 1952, Taiwan produced a .30-06 Springfield version of Bren Mk II, the Type 41.
- Democratic Republic of Congo
- Cyprus
- Denmark: post-war
- Egypt
- France
  - Free France: Used by the Free French Forces and French Resistance.
  - Vichy France: Captured Brens were issued to the Milice.
  - French Far East Expeditionary Corps
- Gambia
- Ghana
- Greece
- Grenada: People's Revolutionary Armed Forces
- Guyana
- Hong Kong: Used by the Royal Hong Kong Regiment.
- India: manufactured by the Ordnance Factories Board Phased out of Indian military service in 2012.
- Indonesia Used by Republican Forces During Indonesian National Revolution :
- Iraq
- Ireland: Irish Defence Forces, replaced by the FN MAG in 1960s. Remained in use with Irish military reserve forces until the early 2000s.
- Israel: During the 1948 Arab–Israeli War and for some time thereafter by the Haganah and the Israel Defense Forces. Replaced after Operation Kadesh (1956).
- Italy: airdropped to partisans and also issued to the Italian Co-Belligerent Army in the latter part of WWII. It continued to see post-war use with the Italian Army. In 1950 rechambered in .30-06 caliber by Breda for the Army, also used by the Italian Police in the same caliber.
- Jamaica
- Empire of Japan: captured weapons.
- Jordan: Arab Legion
- Kenya
- North Korea
- Lesotho
- Libya
- Malaysia
- Myanmar
- Mauritius
- Nazi Germany: used captured examples under the designation 7.7 mm Leichtes MG 138(e)
- Nepal: Bren L4
- Netherlands: Used in post-war
- New Zealand: WWII and L4 post war
- Nigeria
- Norway: post-war
- Pakistan
- Papua New Guinea
- Poland: Used by the Polish Underground State and Polish Armed Forces in the West during World War II.
- Portugal: m/43
- Provisional IRA
- Rhodesia
- Seychelles
- Sierra Leone
- Somali Republic
- South Africa
- Sri Lanka: Used by Ceylon Defence Force in World War II
- Suriname
- Swaziland (now Eswatini)
- Tibet: 294 guns were purchased by the Tibetan Army in 1950.
- Tonga
- Trinidad and Tobago
- Uganda
- United Kingdom: British and Commonwealth forces, and cadet forces until the introduction of the L98 Cadet Rifle
- (South Vietnam) State of Vietnam
- Vietnam: used by Viet-Minh acquired from China and the Soviet Union or by capture
- Soviet Union: Supplied by the United Kingdom during the Lend-Lease program.
- Yugoslavia: Yugoslav Partisans and Chetniks during World War II;
- Zimbabwe:

== Gallery ==
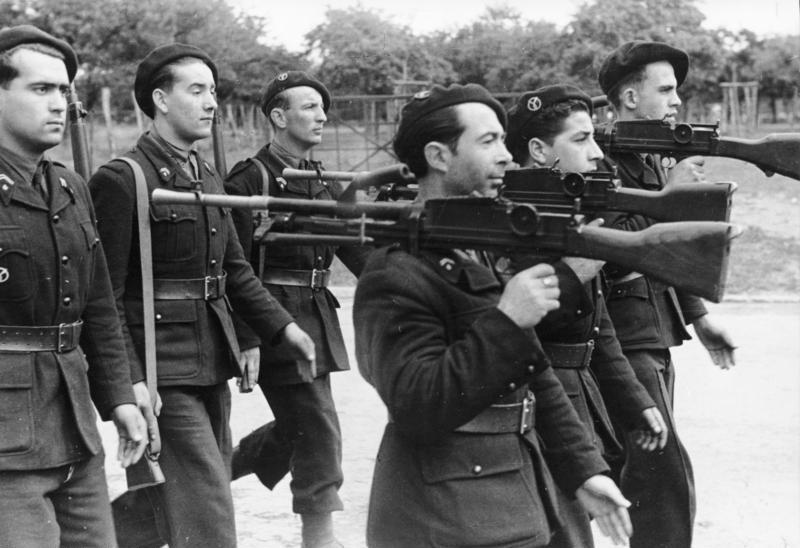
Members of the Milice with captured Bren guns.

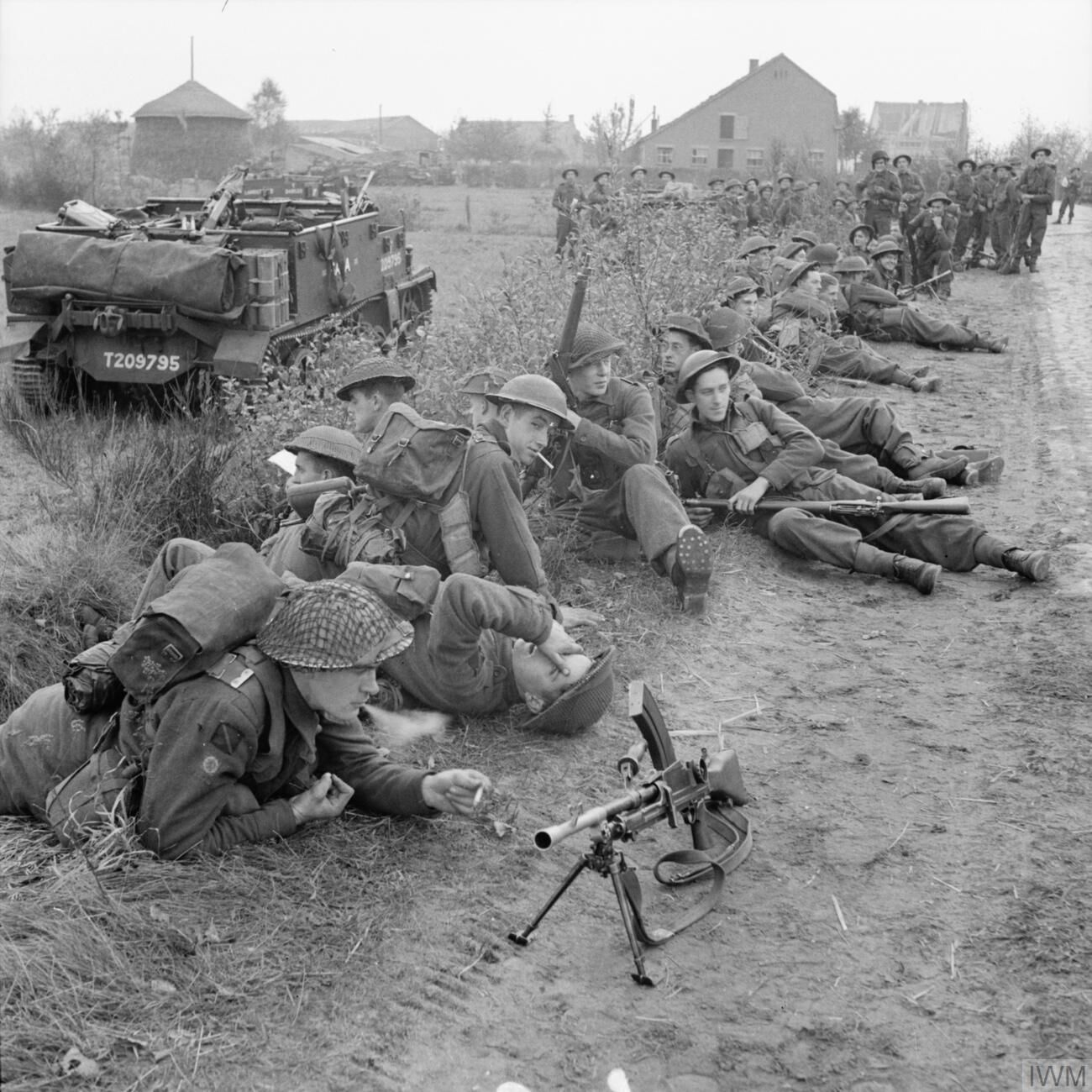
8th Bn Royal Scots with Bren near Tilburg, October 1944

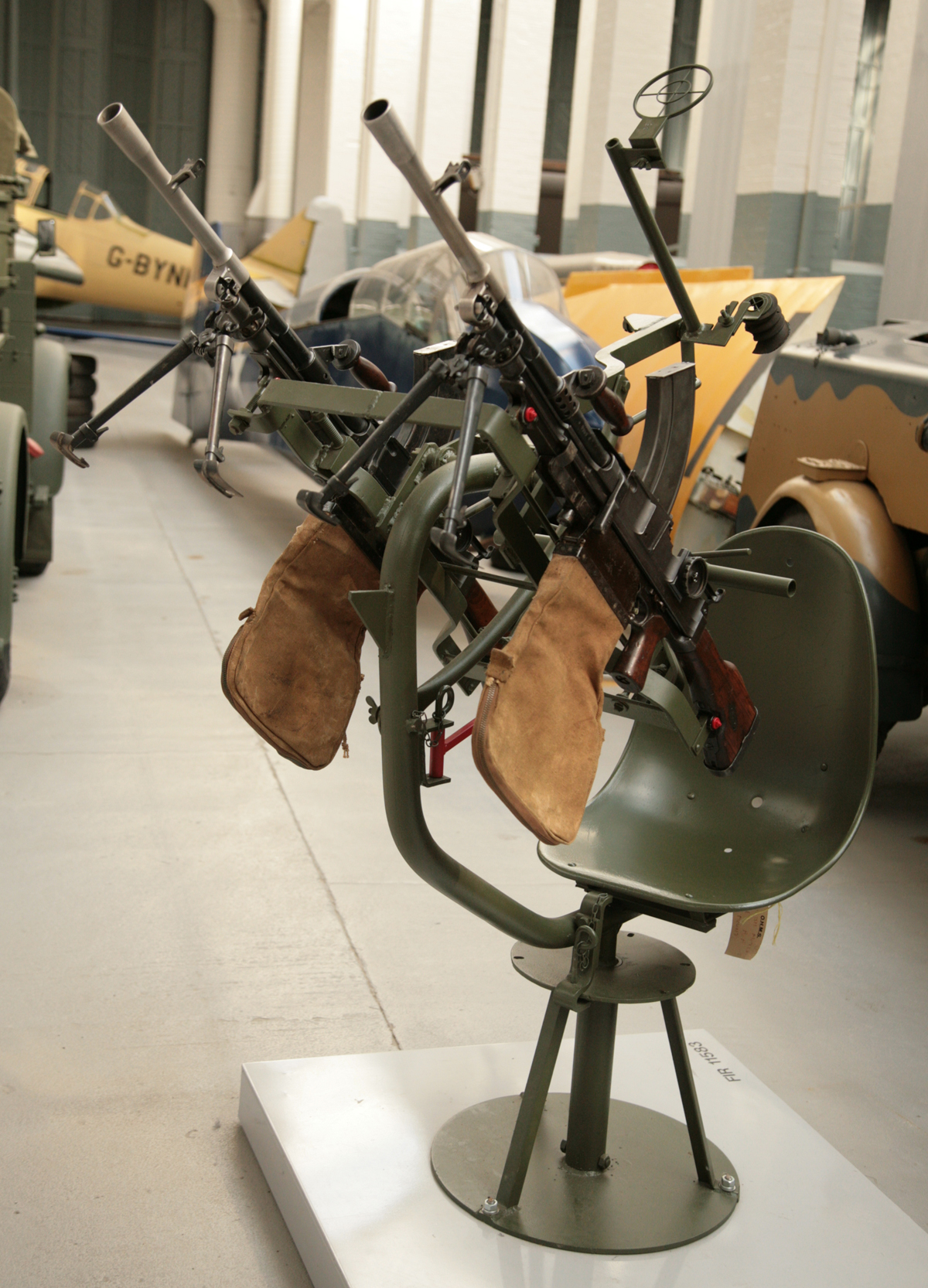
Twin Bren anti-aircraft mounting

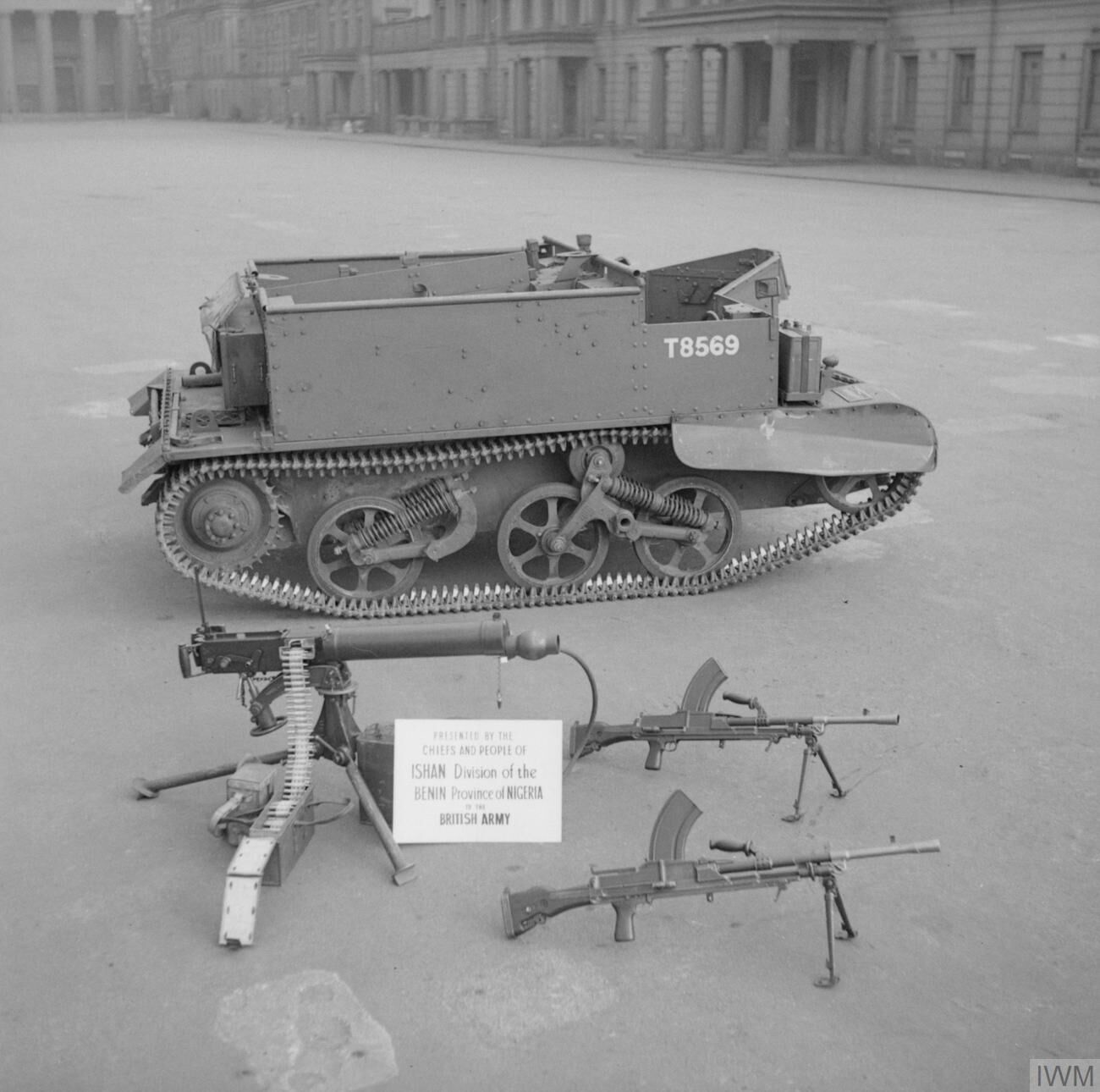
Two Brens (with Universal Carrier and Vickers machine gun) were a gift of the Ishan people in Nigeria to British Army

== In popular culture ==
- "Could You Please Oblige Us with a Bren Gun?" is a humorous song, written and composed in 1941 by Noël Coward, that focuses on the shortages of equipment experienced by the Home Guard in Britain during the Second World War.

== See also ==
- CZ 805 BREN – (Czech Republic)
- Charlton Automatic Rifle – (New Zealand)
- Degtyaryov machine gun – (Soviet Union)
- FM 24/29 light machine gun – (French Third Republic, France)
- Mendoza RM2 – (Mexico)
- Type 73 light machine gun – (North Korea)
- Type 96 light machine gun – (Japan)
- Type 99 light machine gun – (Japan)
- Vickers K machine gun – (United Kingdom)
