= Gun and Shell Factory, Cossipore =

Indian defence manufacturing factory

- Type: Public Sector Undertaking
- Industry: Defence Production
- Predecessor: Ordnance Factory Board
- Founded: 1801
- Headquarters: Kanpur, India
- Products: High-explosive, smoke, illuminating and practice artillery shells
- Owner: Government of India
- Parent: Advanced Weapons and Equipment India Limited

Gun and Shell Factory, Cossipore (GSF) is a defence manufacturing unit located in Cossipore, Kolkata. Founded in 1801, it is one of the oldest continuously operating ordnance factories in India and has played a long-standing role in the production of guns, ammunition, artillery components and metal parts for the Indian Armed Forces.

The factory was formerly a unit of the Ordnance Factory Board. After the corporatisation of ordnance factories in 2021, GSF became a part of Advanced Weapons and Equipment India Limited (AWEIL), which now manages several of India’s weapon and ammunition manufacturing units.

== History ==
Gun and Shell Factory, Cossipore was established in 1801, during the expansion of the Bengal Presidency’s ordnance infrastructure under the East India Company. British-era records describe the factory as a key workshop for the Bengal Artillery, engaged in the production of guns, shells and various forms of ammunition.

Reports from the late nineteenth and early twentieth centuries show that the factory produced shells, metal ammunition components, and equipment for the artillery of British India.

After India’s independence in 1947, the factory became part of the Ordnance Factory Board. Parliamentary debates through the 1950s and 1960s reference its role in the supply of artillery shells and ammunition components to the Indian Army.

== Manufacturing and facilities ==
GSF has long been involved in manufacturing artillery shells, metal components and weapon parts. Its facilities include:

- metal forging and casting units
- machining and processing workshops
- explosive filling and assembly sections
- proof ranges and test facilities
- metallurgical and chemical laboratories

GSF historically supplied a substantial portion of British India’s and later independent India’s shell requirements.

== Products ==
GSF traditionally produces:

- High-explosive, smoke, illuminating and practice artillery shells
- Fuzes, cartridge cases and propellant components
- Metal parts for tank ammunition
- Gun barrels and artillery components
- Spare parts for legacy artillery systems

Studies on India’s defence production system place GSF among the long-standing ammunition manufacturing units supporting the Army.

== Recent developments ==
GSF has recently started naval weapons production in 2024, multiple news outlets reported about the manufacturing components for the AK-630M naval close-in weapon system for Indian Navy vessels.

Indian Express reporting on ammunition procurement has highlighted the growing importance of domestic production centres such as GSF in meeting the Army’s demand for artillery shells and metal components.

The Telegraph and other Kolkata-based newspapers have also covered periodic modernisation and safety upgrades at GSF, including improvements to workshops and equipment.

== Organisation ==
The factory is operated by Advanced Weapons and Equipment India Limited, which manages former OFB units involved in weapons, ammunition and artillery-system manufacturing.

== Legacy ==
With more than 200 years of continuous operation, GSF is considered one of the oldest defence-industrial establishments in India. It has contributed to British India’s colonial artillery infrastructure and later to modern India’s ammunition and weapon manufacturing ecosystem.

== See also ==
- Ordnance Factory Board
- Advanced Weapons and Equipment India Limited
- Field Gun Factory, Kanpur
- Rifle Factory Ishapore
