= Vickers–Berthier =

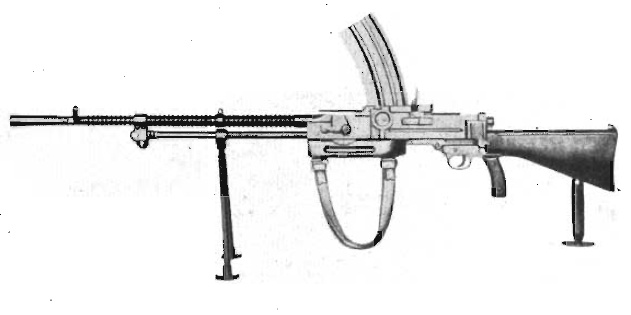
- Type: Light machine gun
- Place of origin: France/United Kingdom

Service history
- Used by: See users
- Wars: Chaco War; Spanish Civil War; World War II

Production history
- Designer: André Virgile Paul Marie Berthier (1858-1923)
- Designed: 1910 (first version); 1925 (Vickers-Berthier)
- Manufacturer: Vickers-Armstrong, Rifle Factory Ishapore
- Produced: 1933-1942

Specifications
- Mass: 24.4 lb (11.1 kg)
- Length: 45.5 in (1.156 m)
- Calibre: .303 British, 7.65×53mm Mauser
- Action: Gas-operated, tilting breech-block
- Rate of fire: 450-600 round/min
- Muzzle velocity: 2,450 ft/s (745 m/s)
- Feed system: 30 rounds box magazine
- Sights: Iron

The Vickers–Berthier (VB) is a light machine gun that was produced by the British company Vickers-Armstrong. It was adopted by the British Indian Army and saw combat during World War II.

== History ==
=== Berthier machine gun ===
The Vickers–Berthier was based on a French design of just before World War I. It was proposed for use with infantry as Fusil Mitrailleur Berthier Modèle 1910, Modèle 1911, Modèle 1912, Modèle 1916 and Modèle 1920. It was also proposed in 1918 to US Army which finally refused it. A later version, the Fusil Mitrailleur Berthier Modèle 1922 from Manufacture d'armes de Châtellerault, competed for the replacement of the Chauchat LMG in the French army but the Fusil Mitrailleur modèle 1924 was adopted.

=== Vickers–Berthier machine gun ===
In 1925 Vickers in Britain purchased the licence rights of the Berthier Model 1922 for production in their Crayford factory, and as a replacement for the Lewis gun. It was an alternative to the water-cooled Vickers machine gun made by the same company. The weapon used a gas and tipping bolt mechanism similar to the Bren light machine gun, was air-cooled like the Bren and also like the Bren had a removable barrel. It was adopted by the Indian Army in 1933. During the British Army trials of several light machine guns which began in 1932, the Vickers–Berthier was in direct competition with the ZB vz. 26. The British Army adopted the latter, modified and known as the Bren light machine gun, and the Vickers–Berthier was adopted by the Indian Army. A production line for the Vickers–Berthier Light Machine-Gun Mk 3 was established at the Rifle Factory Ishapore.

== Appearance and design ==
The Vickers–Berthier Light Machine Gun has a 30-round box magazine and a bipod stand, and is sometimes mistaken for the Bren as both used a similar curved magazine to accommodate the rimmed .303 British cartridge.

It was slightly heavier, at 24 pounds (11 kg), than the Bren's 22 lb (10.0 kg). It was also slightly longer, and harder to stow away. The Vickers–Berthier also had a slower cyclic rate of 500 rpm. The only major advantage the weapon had over the Bren was the far simpler design; it could be produced more efficiently.

It existed in five versions : Mk I, Mk II, Mk II light, Mk III and Mk IIIB. Mark 1 was introduced in 1928, Mark 2 in 1931 and Mark 3 in 1933.

== Use ==
Apart from India, it was sold only to Latvia and Bolivia, but the design was modified into the Vickers K machine gun (also use called the Vickers Gas Operated (VGO)).

In Indian service, it was replaced from 1942 by Brens but continued to serve with reserve units of the Indian Army into the 1980s.

=== Users ===
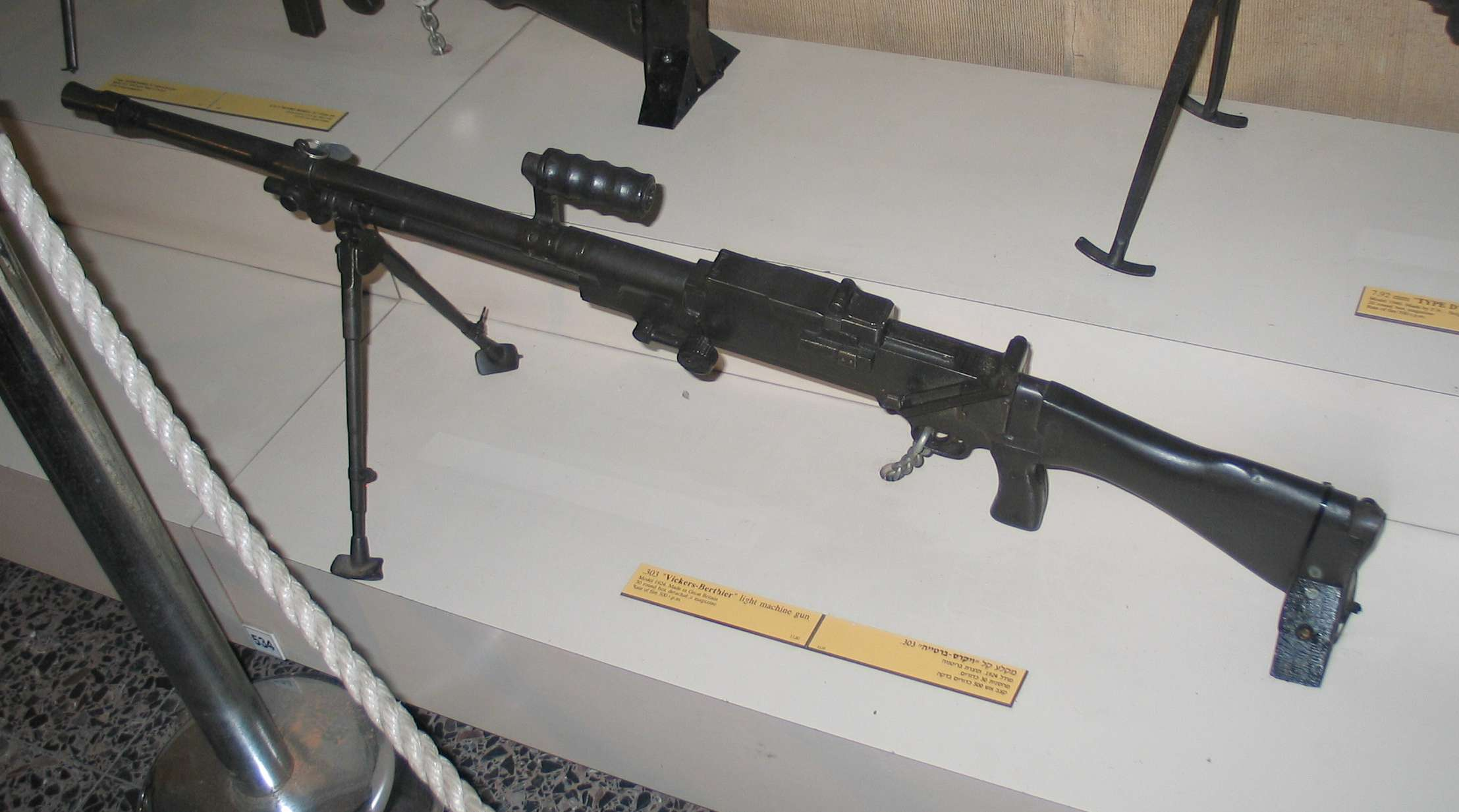
Vickers–Berthier on display at Batey ha-Osef Museum

- Bolivia
- British India
- India
- Latvia: Vickers–Berthier Mk I, more than 800 by April 1936
- Paraguay: Captured from Bolivia
- Portugal: small numbers bought, known as m/931
- Kingdom of Spain: small numbers bought
- Spanish Republic: 322 sold by Paraguay in 1936
- United Kingdom: limited use
- Afghanistan: Used by Taliban

=== Failed bids ===
- Romania: Vickers–Berthier gun was tested in 1927-1928, without success
- Greece: Tested by Greek Army in 1925, which chose Hotchkiss machine gun instead

== Bibliography ==
- Bishop, Chris (1998). The Encyclopedia of Weapons of World War II. New York: MetroBooks. ISBN 1-58663-762-2.
- Grant, Jonathan A (2018). Between Depression and Disarmament: The International Armaments Business, 1919–1939. Cambridge University Press. doi:10.1017/9781108552721. ISBN 9781108428354.
- Grant, Neil (2013). The Bren Gun. Weapon 22. Osprey Publishing. ISBN 978-1782000822.
- Smith, Joseph E. (1969). Small Arms of the World (9th ed.). Harrisburg, Pennsylvania: The Stackpole Company. ISBN 0-8117-1566-3.
- Willbanks, James H. (2004). Machine Guns: An Illustrated History of Their Impact. ABC-CLIO. ISBN 978-1-85109-480-6.
