= Ordnance Factory, Kanpur =

Indian weapons production company

Ordnance Factory Kanpur
- Type: Government defence manufacturing unit
- Industry: Defence production
- Predecessor: Ordnance Factory Board
- Founded: 1943
- Headquarters: Kanpur, India
- Owner: Government of India
- Parent: Advanced Weapons and Equipment India

Ordnance Factory Kanpur (OFK) is a defence factory in Kanpur, Uttar Pradesh. It was set up in 1943 during the Second World War. The factory has mainly made body armour, helmets, parachutes, textile gear and different parts used by the Indian Armed Forces.

OFK was earlier part of the Ordnance Factory Board. In 2021, after the ordnance factories were corporatised, it became a unit of Advanced Weapons and Equipment India Limited (AWEIL). During this change, discussions in Parliament mentioned that Kanpur had been supplying protective gear and textile items to the armed forces for many decades.

== History ==
The factory began in 1943 to help meet wartime needs. Records from that period show that Kanpur was making uniforms, web equipment and parachute items in large numbers.

After independence, the factory slowly added new products, including body armour, helmets, metal parts and parachute systems. Studies on India’s defence industry mention Kanpur as an important place for protective gear and parachute development.

Parachute used by the Indian Army and Indian Air Force over the years were partly developed in the Kanpur factories.

A detailed history of the ordnance factories also explains how Kanpur became one of the major centres for textile and equipment production after independence.

== Products ==
OFK makes several items used by the Army and police forces. These include:

- bullet proof jackets and armour plates
- helmets and protective gears
- parachutes and airborne systems
- textile webbing items
- vehicle and engineering parts

Kanpur has become one of India’s main centres for making armour and protective jackets for soldiers and police.

Security forces also needs lighter armours, which has led to more work on such designs in Kanpur.

The Indian Army has placed orders for armour plates from factories in the Kanpur area.

== Manufacturing and facilities ==
The factory has textile units, metal workshops, assembly areas and testing ranges where armour and helmets are checked.Testing work in the Kanpur defence factories has grown in recent years with new machines and standards.

The DRDO’s history of parachute development also mentions the role of Kanpur factories in airborne systems.OFK also works with the Small Arms Factory and the Parachute Factory Kanpur in areas like testing and textile-related development.

A government audit reviewed the quality and production work of defence factories in Kanpur, including protective gear and parachute items.

== Recent developments ==
Since 2021, OFK has operated under Advanced Weapons and Equipment India Limited. New armour materials and improved helmet designs have been tested in recent years.

The Army’s updated armour standards have increased production requirements for factories in the Kanpur area.The defence factories in Kanpur have also gone through modernisation work, including changes to testing methods, new machines and improvements in material research.

A parliamentary committee also noted Kanpur’s contribution to the country’s protective equipment supply chain.

== See also ==
- Ordnance Factory Board
- Advanced Weapons and Equipment India Limited
- Small Arms Factory
- Field Gun Factory Kanpur
- Parachute Factory Kanpur
- Indian Ordnance Factories
- Defence industry of India
