= IOF .30-06 sporting rifle =

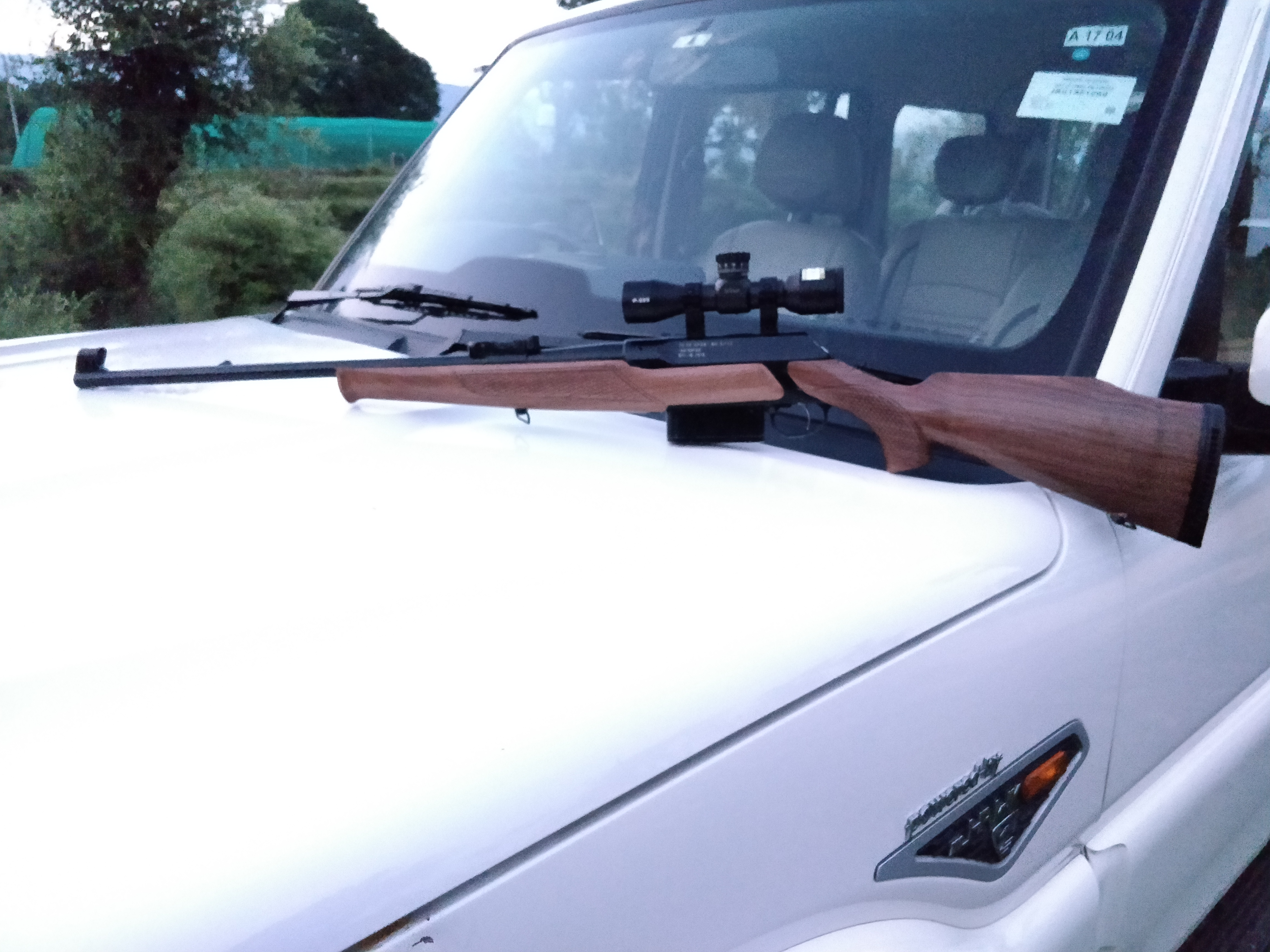
- IOF .30-06 Sporting Rifle with Nikon P223 3x 32 mm Riflescope mounted
- Type: Bolt-action rifle
- Place of origin: India

Production history
- Manufacturer: Rifle Factory Ishapore
- Produced: 2007

Specifications
- Mass: 3.00 kg (6.61 lb)
- Length: 1,125 mm (44.3 in)
- Cartridge: .30-06 Springfield
- Action: Bolt-action
- Effective firing range: 400 metres (440 yd)
- Feed system: 3 or 5 round box type magazine

The IOF .30-06 sporting rifle is a bolt-action rifle manufactured by the Rifle Factory Ishapore.

As the name suggests, it is chambered in .30-06.

== Gallery ==
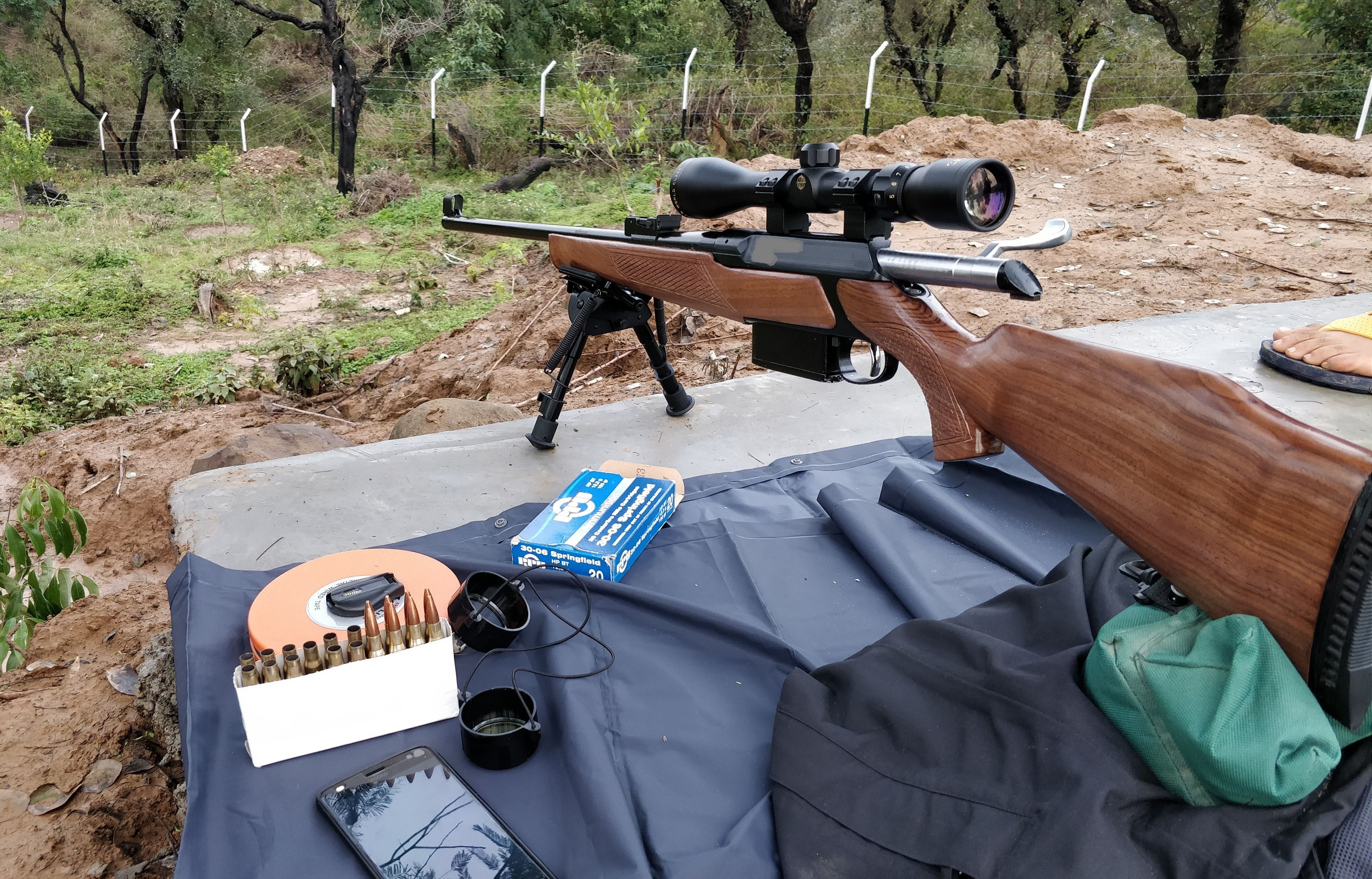
IOF .30-06 Sporting Rifle with Tasco 3-9x 40 mm Riflescope and Haris Bipod mounted at a private range in J&K, India.

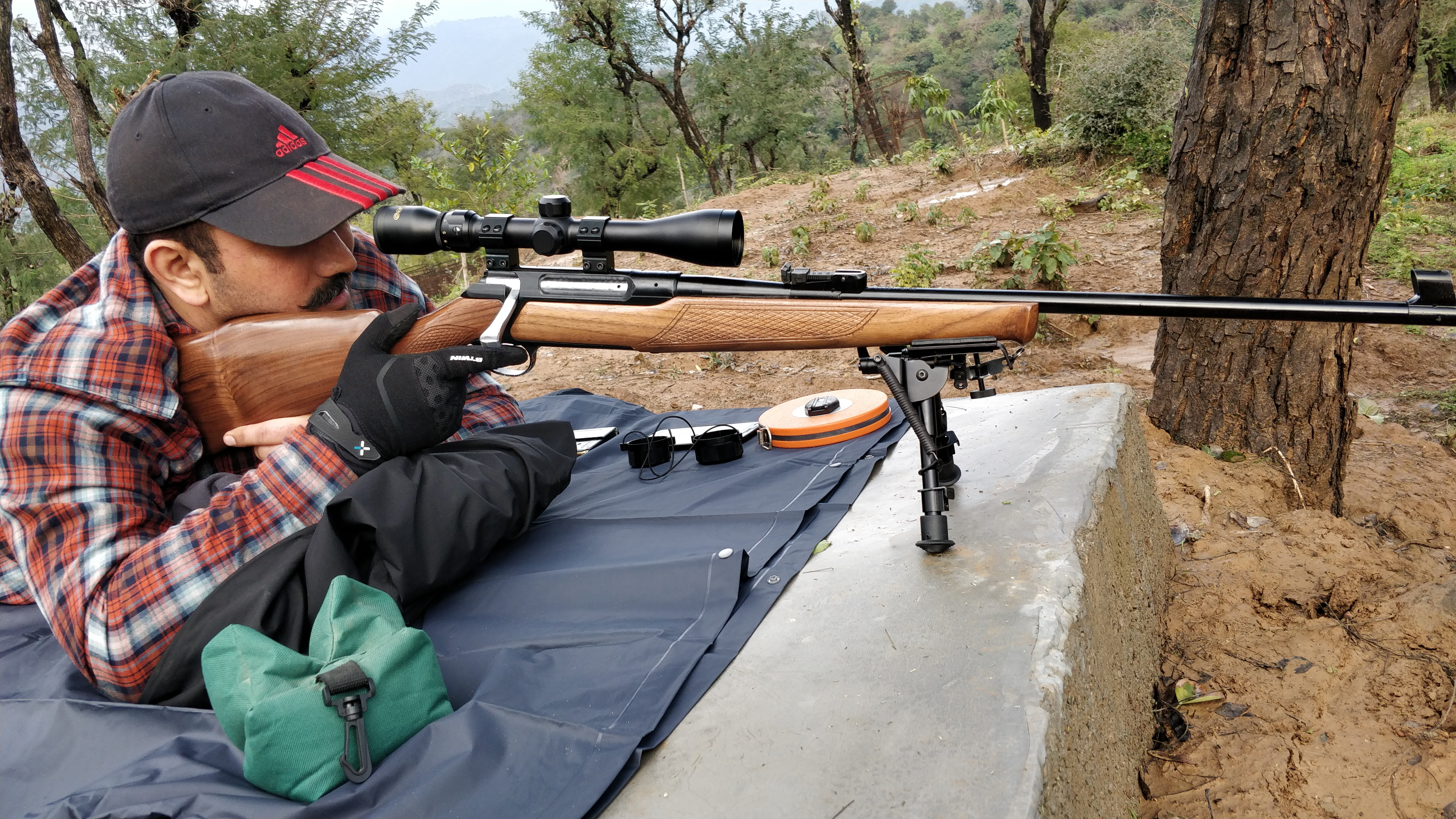
Shooter taking aim with his IOF .30-06 Sporting Rifle with Tasco 3-9x 40 mm Riflescope and Haris Bipod mounted at a private range in J&K, India

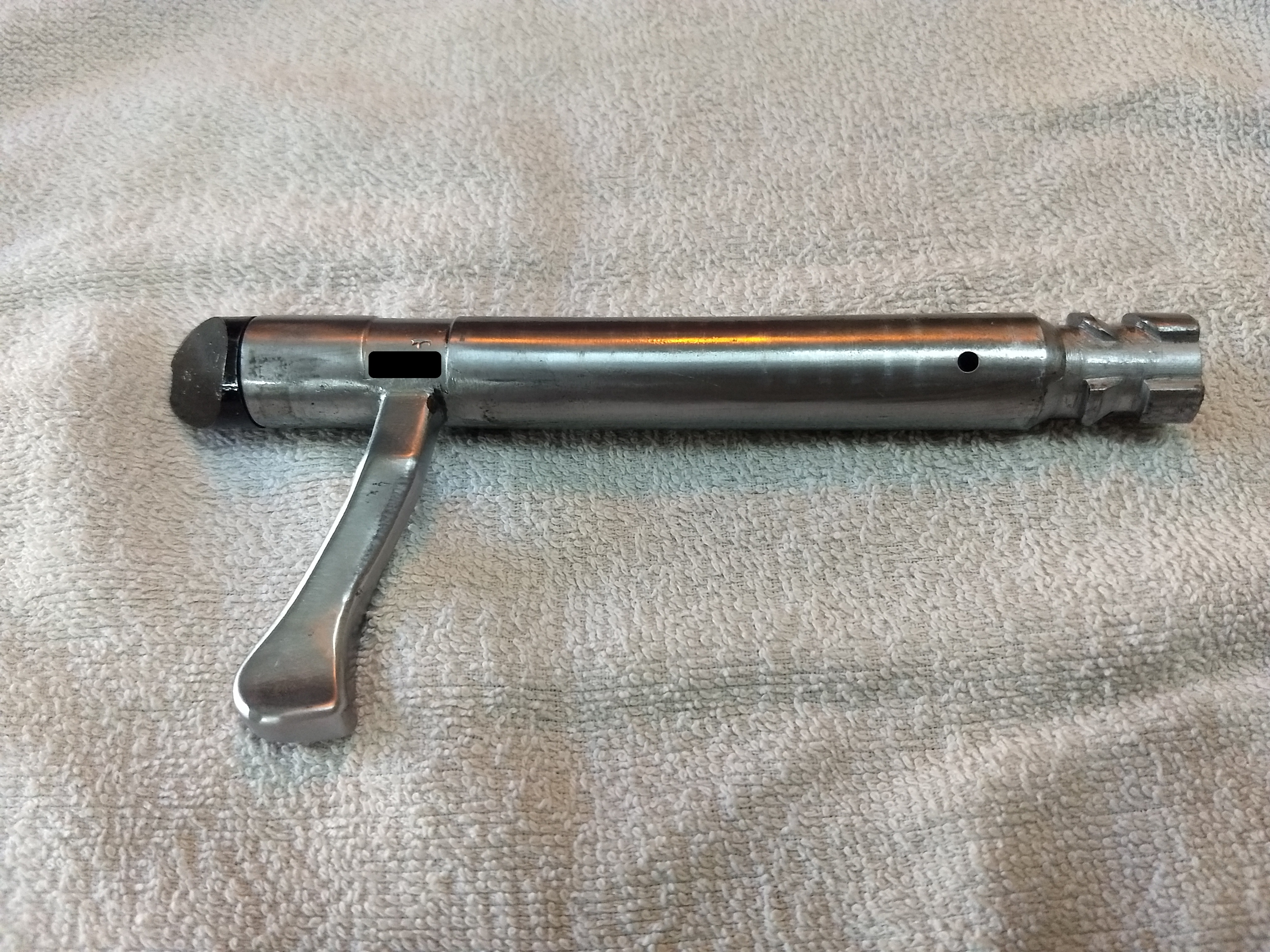
Right View of Bolt of IOF .30-06 Sporting Rifle

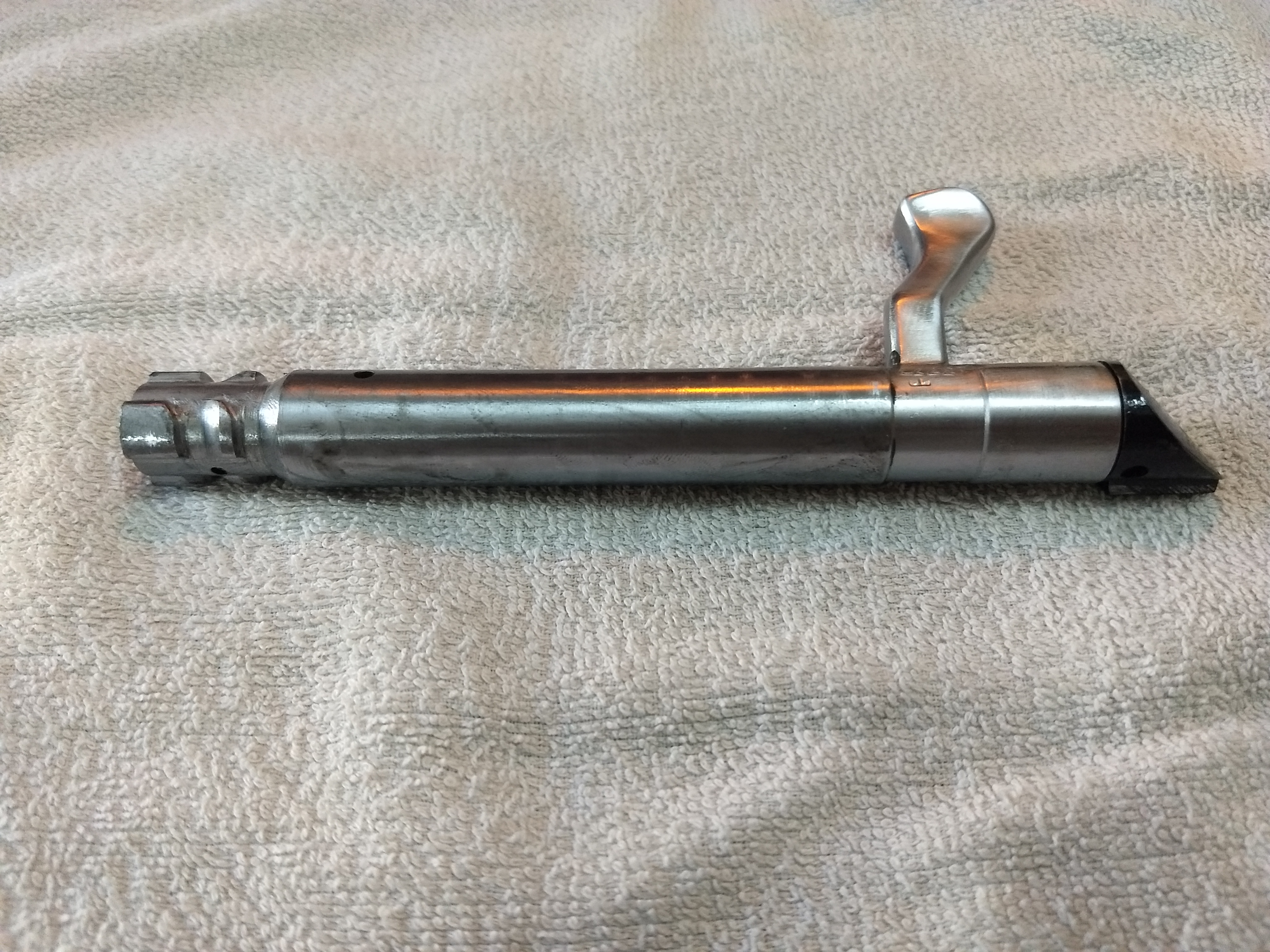
Left View of Bolt of IOF .30-06 Sporting Rifle

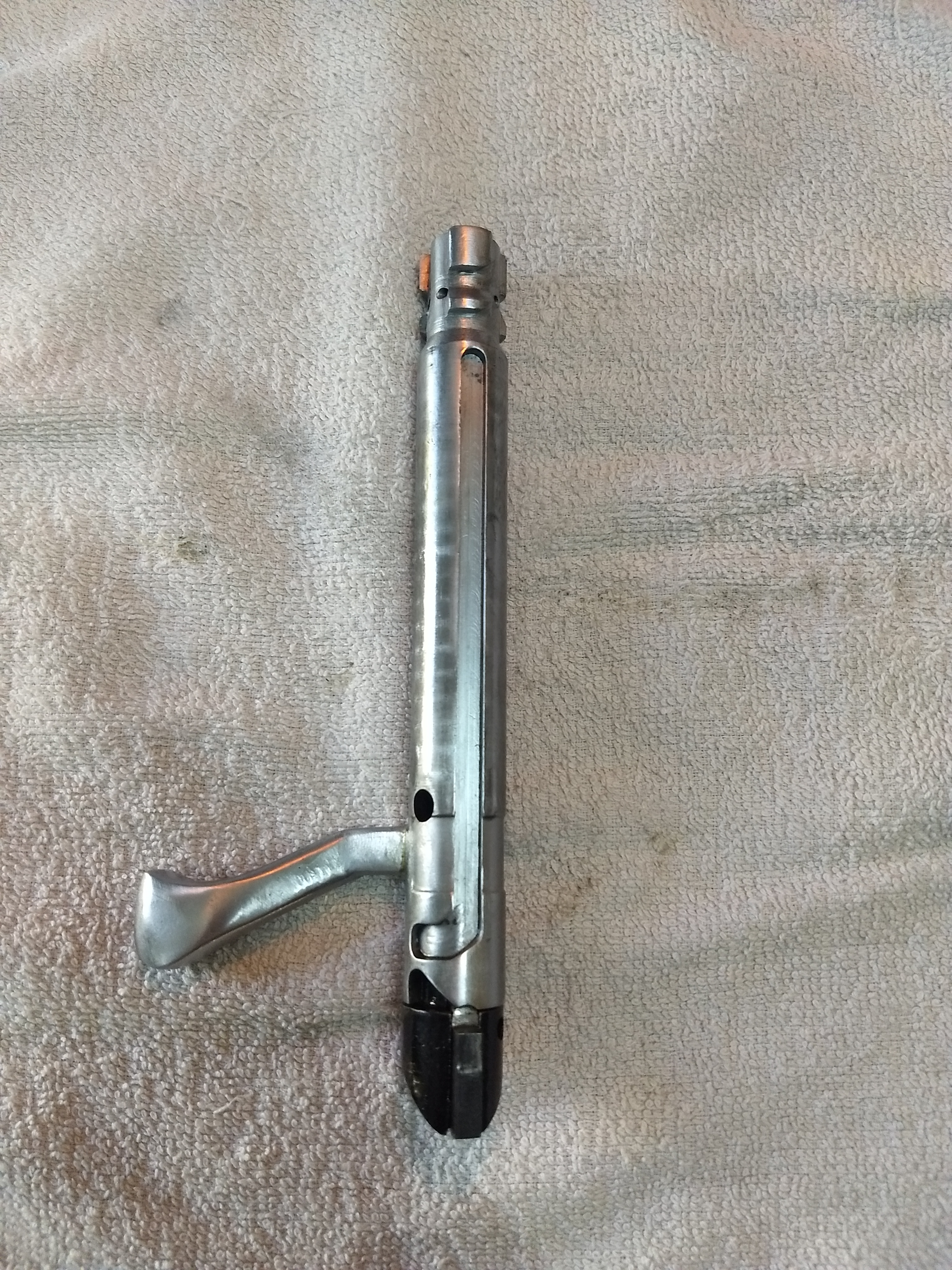
Top View of Bolt of IOF .30-06 Sporting Rifle
