= Advanced Weapons and Equipment India =

Indian weapons production company

Advanced Weapons and Equipment India Limited
- Type: Public Sector Undertaking
- Industry: Defence Production
- Predecessor: Ordnance Factory Board
- Founded: 1 October 2021
- Headquarters: Ordnance Factory Kanpur, Kanpur, India
- Key people: Shri Umesh Singh, IOFS
- Products: Small arms,
- Owner: Government of India
- Divisions: Field Gun Factory, Kanpur; Gun and Shell Factory Cossipore; Gun Carriage Factory Jabalpur; Ordnance factory Kanpur; Ordnance Factory Project Korwa; Ordnance Factory Tiruchirappalli; Rifle Factory Ishapore; Small Arms Factory, Kanpur
- Website: aweil.in

Advanced Weapons and Equipment India Limited (AWEIL) is an Indian defence public sector undertaking, headquartered in Kanpur, India. AWE primarily manufactures small arms and artillery guns for the Indian Armed Forces, foreign militaries, and domestic civilian use.

== History ==
AWEIL was established in 2021 as part of the restructuring and corporatisation of the Ordnance Factory Board, which was divided into seven different Public Sector Undertakings.

== Factories ==
AWEIL consists of the following factories of the erstwhile Ordnance Factory Board:

- Field Gun Factory, Kanpur
- Gun and Shell Factory, Cossipore
- Gun Carriage Factory Jabalpur
- Ordnance Factory, Kanpur
- Ordnance Factory Project Korwa
- Ordnance Factory Tiruchirappalli
- Rifle Factory Ishapore
- Small Arms Factory, Kanpur

AWEIL has an ownership stake in Indo-Russia Rifles alongside Kalashnikov Concern and Rosoboronexport.

== Skill development ==
=== Ordnance Factories Institute of Learning Ishapore ===
Training activity at the company includes the work of the Ordnance Factories Institute of Learning at Ishapore. The centre have long offered courses in trades like machining, fitting and other technical skills, and this training setup continued after the reorganisation of the factories into defence public sector units.

Apprenticeship programmes and skill-upgrade courses remain part of the training framework, providing practical experience to new and existing workers.

Training activity in the Kolkata defence manufacturing cluster also includes routine safety exercises and hands-on instruction related to workshop practices.

== See also ==
- Armoured Vehicles Nigam Limited (AVNL), Chennai
- Gliders India Limited (GIL), Kanpur
- India Optel Limited (IOL), Dehradun
- Munitions India Limited (MIL), Pune
- Troop Comforts Limited (TCL), Kanpur
- Yantra India Limited (YIL), Nagpur
