= Pistol Auto 9mm 1A =

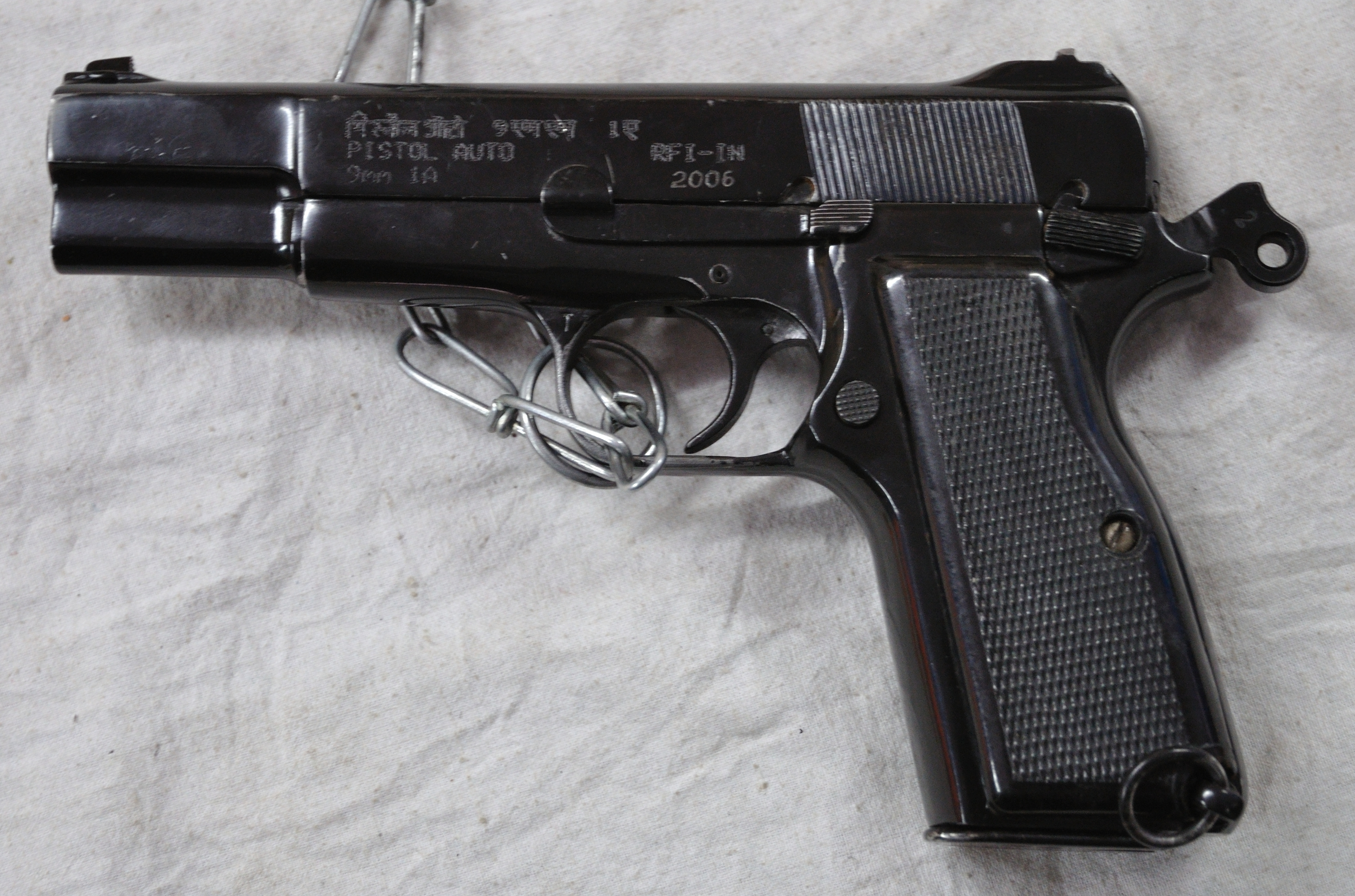
- Pistol Auto 9mm 1A
- Type: Semi-automatic pistol
- Place of origin: India

Service history
- In service: 1981–present
- Used by: See Users

Production history
- Designer: John Browning (Note: Being one of the designers of the original Browning Hi-Power, which the 1A pistol is based on.); Dieudonné Saive (Note: Being one of the designers of the original Browning Hi-Power, which the 1A pistol is based on.)
- Designed: 1973
- Manufacturer: Rifle Factory Ishapore
- Produced: 1977–present
- No. built: 12,000 (2012); 650,000 (2014)

Specifications
- Cartridge: 9×19mm Parabellum
- Caliber: 9 mm
- Action: Short recoil operated
- Rate of fire: Semi-automatic
- Muzzle velocity: 396 m/s (1,300 ft/s)
- Effective firing range: 50 m (55 yd)
- Maximum firing range: 200 m
- Feed system: 13-round detachable box magazine
- Sights: Iron sights

The Pistol Auto 9mm 1A, also known as IOF 9mm pistol, is a semi-automatic pistol manufactured by Rifle Factory Ishapore as a copy of the Browning Hi-Power. These were made using tooling acquired from John Inglis and Company.

== History ==
In 1971, preliminary works was established to make Pistol Auto 9mm 1A. The first 1A was manufactured in 1977, while large-scale manufacturing began in 1981.

== Design ==
The Pistol Auto 9mm 1A has the same design as the Browning Hi-Power. Like the original Hi-Power, the Pistol Auto 9mm 1A is a recoil-operated, magazine-fed, self-loading, hammer-fired, semi-automatic pistol that uses 9×19mm Parabellum ammunition used from 13-round magazines.

The pistol can also be equipped with a suppressor.

== Users ==
- India:
  - Indian Armed Forces
  - Law enforcement in India
- Nepal: Nepalese Army with 15,000 pistols
