= Field Gun Factory, Kanpur =

Weapons manufacturing factory

- Type: Division
- Industry: Defence
- Founded: 1979
- Headquarters: Kalpi Road, Kanpur, India
- Parent: Advanced Weapons and Equipment India Limited (current); Ordnance Factory Board (former)
- Website: https://aweil.in

Field Gun Factory, Kanpur (FGK) is a weapons manufacturing unit located in Kanpur, Uttar Pradesh. The factory was set up in 1979 to produce artillery guns, spares, and related equipment for the Indian Armed Forces.

The factory was once part of the Ordnance Factory Board (OFB). After the corporatisation of OFB in 2021, it became a unit under Advanced Weapons and Equipment India Limited (AWEIL), a defence public sector enterprise under the Ministry of Defence.

== History ==
Field Gun Factory, Kanpur was established in 1979 as part of India’s plan to expand domestic manufacturing of artillery systems. For decades it produced field guns, barrels, assemblies, and other key components for the Army’s artillery units.

In 2021, the Government of India dissolved the Ordnance Factory Board and moved all factories into seven new PSUs. FGK was placed under AWEIL, which manages weapon and equipment production units.

== Products and work ==
The factory mainly produces:

- field gun components
- barrels and spares
- assemblies used in towed and medium artillery systems
- repair and overhaul work for older guns

The factory has long supported India’s 105 mm and 130 mm artillery systems by supplying spare parts and carrying out refurbishment work.

== Recent developments ==
In 2024 and 2025, Field Gun Factory began a series of upgrades on older towed field guns to extend their service life. The work includes improvements to recoil systems, new assemblies, and structural repairs. These upgrades were reported as part of a wider effort to modernise existing artillery while new systems are introduced.

Reports also highlight that the Kanpur defence factories, including FGK, have been receiving modernisation funds and new machinery as part of AWEIL’s ongoing upgrade programme.

== Organisation ==
Field Gun Factory is operated by Advanced Weapons and Equipment India Limited, which oversees several former OFB factories. AWEIL continues to supply weapons, small arms, artillery components, and related equipment to the Indian Armed Forces.

== See also ==
- Advanced Weapons and Equipment India Limited
- Ordnance Factory Board
- Munitions India
- Gun and Shell Factory, Cossipore
