= IOF .22 sporting rifle =

The IOF .22 sporting rifle is a bolt-action .22 Long Rifle caliber rifle made by the Indian Ordnance Factory. The rifle weighs approximately 3 kilograms (6.6 lb) and has a magazine capacity of 10 rounds.

== Specifications ==
Specifications
Calibre	.22 inch L.R.
Barrel length	632 mm
Chamber	International standard L.R. (5.70 mm × 16.50 mm)
Groove	6, right-hand, 1 turn in 200 mm
Range	200 m maximum
Safety	Rear-end top lever safety
Trigger pull	Adjustable (minimum 1 kg)
Weight	3 kilograms (6.6 lb) approx.
Overall length	1092 mm
Furniture	Wooden
Magazine capacity	10 rounds
