= Rifle Factory Ishapore =

Indian state-owned arms manufacturing unit

Coordinates: 22.803°N 88.369°E

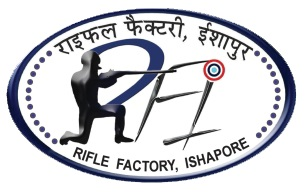
- Company type: Division
- Industry: Defence
- Founded: 1904; 122 years ago
- Headquarters: Ichapore, West Bengal, India
- Key people: A. K. Singh; Executive Director)
- Parent: Advanced Weapons and Equipment India Limited (current); Ordnance Factory Board (Till 2021)
- Website: ddpdoo.gov.in

The Rifle Factory Ishapore (also known as Ishapore Arsenal) is an Indian state-owned arms manufacturing unit located at Ichapore in the state of West Bengal.

== History ==
In 1904, a rifle factory was established by the British at Ichapore, anglicized as Ishapore, and began production of the Lee–Enfield rifle, which has continued, more or less, until the mid-1980s, and possibly the present. The factory also manufactured the Vickers-Berthier (VB) light machine gun, which was adopted in 1932 by the Indian Army and remains in reserve use.

Military rifles manufactured at Ishapore 1949 and pre-1949 are stamped "GRI" on the buttsocket, referring to George Rex, Imperator (i.e. King George VI, last Emperor of India), whilst military rifles manufactured 1949 and post-1948 are stamped "RFI", which stands for Rifle Factory, Ishapore. The factory was administered by the Ordnance Factory Board of India till 2021 when it was corporatised under the ownership of Advanced Weapons and Equipment India Limited.

== Products ==
The .303 British calibre Short Magazine Lee–Enfield Mk III, the 7.62×51mm NATO calibre Ishapore 2A1 rifle and the 7.62mm NATO L1A1 Self-Loading Rifle were manufactured at RFI.

It now manufactures the 5.56mm INSAS rifle assault rifle, Kalantak rifle, Ghatak rifle (7.62×39mm AKM-style assault rifle),7.62 Sniper Rifles and Pistol Auto 9mm 1A for military/law enforcement. RFI makes other firearms such as IOF .22 revolver, IOF .315 sporting rifle, IOF .30-06 sporting rifle and IOF .22 sporting rifle for civilian customers.

== Noted employees ==
- Amal Dutta
