= List of infantry equipment of the Indian Army =

The below is a list of current infantry equipment of the Indian Army and its future equipment procurements.

== Individual equipment ==
Name	Image	Type	Quantity	Origin Country	Notes
Uniforms and Gears
New Battle Dress Uniform (NBDU) (2022–present)		Military camouflage Combat uniform	N/A	India	Status: In service Designed by the National Institute of Fashion Technology (NIFT), consisting of a pixelated camouflage pattern, with improved ergonomics and greater operational efficiency. Was first revealed on Army Day 2022.
Indian Army Snow Camouflage		Military camouflage Combat uniform	N/A	India	Status: In service
New Coat Combat (Digital Print)		Military camouflage Combat uniform	N/A	India	Status: In service. Designed by NIFT.
PC-DPM (c.2006-2026)		Military camouflage Combat uniform	N/A	France	Status: In service/being phased out. Standard uniform since 2006 using French CCE pattern printed on BDU. Being replaced by new NIFT made uniform since 2022. The uniform will remain in service till June 2026.
High altitude combat uniform		Combat uniform	N/A	India	Status: In service/being phased out. to be replaced by New Indian Army Snow Camouflage. Used extensively on high altitudes such as Siachen Glacier
Boot Anti Mine Infantry (BAMI)		Combat boots	N/A	India	Status: In Service, used by forward troops Developed by DRDO
Ballistic Vest and Protective Gear
Bhabha Kavach		Ballistic vest	<30,000	India	Status: In service, Unknown numbers in service. Named after Homi J. Bhabha
SMPP Vest		Ballistic Vest	2,36,138(236,138)	India	Status: In service, Manufactured by SMPP Pvt. Ltd. First order was placed in 2016 through revenue route for 50,000 vests in 2016 with all delivered by 2017. A second order was placed in April 2018 for 1,86,138 (186,138) bulletproof vests worth ₹639 crore (US$93.44 million) while deliveries were completed by August 2024. An additional order for 27,700 units as part of a larger ₹300 crore (equivalent to ₹310 crore or US$33 million in 2026) deal placed in July 2025. The vest features dynamic load distribution and quick release system.
Tata 360 Ballistic Vest	Tata Vest	Ballistic vest	62,500	India	Status: In service, Ordered under emergency procurement.
Advanced Ballistics for High Energy Defeat (ABHED)		Ballistic vest		India	Status: Developed; to be ordered. Developed by DRDO and IIT Delhi. Provides 360° protection weighing 8.2 kg to 9.5 kg.
CBRN Suit		Chemical, biological, nuclear radiation suit	N/A	India	Status: In Service, protects from chemical, biological, nuclear radiation.
Bomb Blast Protection Suit		Bomb suit	N/A	India	In Service, manufactured by DRDO
Head Protective Gear
Total		Ballistic helmet	~480,000		As per a 2020 report, 4.8 lakh frontline troops are equipped with ballistic helmets which is about 40% of the requirement. The service had released an RFI to meet another 50% of the requirement in 2020. Approximately 10% of the procurement will be reserved for future helmet upgrades.
Patka (Model- 1) (Model- 2) (Model- 3)	Patka Helmet of the Indian army	Combat helmet	N/A	India	Status: In service (to be phased out), used extensively for counterinsurgency by the Indian Army. Variants mentioned provide different areas of protection to the head and are composed of steel and kevlar. Weighs about 2.5 kg. Can provide protection against AK-47 rounds.
Model 1974 Ballistic Helmet	Model 1974 ballistic helmet	Combat helmet	>1,000,000	India	Status: Standard issue helmet. Equipped with fibre-glass body and nylon suspender. Can withstand 9mm carbine shot. Currently being replaced by MKU Advanced Combat Helmets and EXFIL High Cut Helmets.
MKU Mukut		Combat helmet	1,58,279(158,279)	India	Status: In service. It can withstand a 9mm shot from 10 m distance. An order for 1,58,279 (158,279) combat helmets was placed in December 2016 through capital route at the cost of ₹170 crore (US$25.3 million). The first batch of 7,500 helmets was delivered in June 2018. The Indian Navy also received 13,981 helmets. They will be used for counterterrorism along the Line of Control, counterinsurgency in the Northeast India and UN peacekeeping missions. Includes 50,000 with integrated communication for commanders.
SMPP Ballistic Helmet		Combat helmet	N/A	India	Status: On order. 80,000 ordered by August 2024. 3,600 units will be allocated for counterterrorism units. An RFI for one lakh units was issued in 2020. The acquisition was cleared in December 2022. They are meant to protect from 7.62×39mm mild steel core rounds at a 10 m range and high-speed blast fragmentation. additional order for 11,700 units as part of a ₹300 crore (equivalent to ₹310 crore or US$33 million in 2026) deal placed in July 2025.
TATA Advanced Combat Helmet	Tata Ballistic helmet	Combat helmet	10,000	India	Status: In service. Designed and produced by Tata Advanced Materials Limited and inducted in 2010.
OR-201	OR 201 Bulletproof Helmet	Combat helmet	N/A	Israel	Status: In service. Used by Para SF, Paratroopers since 2008.
Exfil High Cut Ballistic Helmet		Combat helmet	N/A	United States	Status: In service. used by Para SF
Galvion Viper P2		Combat helmet	N/A	United States	Status: In service.

== Infantry weapons ==
=== Knives and bayonets ===
Name	Image	Type	Origin	Notes
M9 bayonet		Bayonet	United States	Status: In Service, being phased out. Standard issue combat knife and bayonet of the Indian Army.
Glock knife		Combat Knife	Austria	Status: In Service. Standard service issue knife of the special forces.
Naga Dao		Utility knife	India	Status: In service. Used by the Naga Regiment for various purposes
Khukri		Utility knife	Gorkha Kingdom	Status: In Service. Standard issue Utility knife of the Gorkha regiments. Khukri traditionally associated with Gurkha.
Kirpan		Dagger	India	Status: In Service. Carried by the Sikh Regiment and Sikh Light Infantry as per the Sikh religious commandments.

=== Small arms ===
Name	Weapon	Type	Caliber	Origin	Notes
Handguns
Pistol Auto 9mm 1A		Semi-automatic pistol	9×19mm	India; Canada	Status: In service. Standard side-arm of the Indian Army, manufactured under license from John Inglis and Company by Ordnance Factory Board, used by special forces in small numbers.
Glock		Semi-automatic pistol	9×19mm	Austria	Status: In service. Standard special forces pistol.
Beretta Px4 Storm		Semi-automatic pistol	9×19mm	Italy	Status: In service, with special forces.
Nonlinear line of sight weapons
ShootEdge		CornerShot	9×19mm	India	Status: In service, can use all pistols in service as main weapon. It is equivalent to Israel's Cornershot
DRDO CSWS (CornerShot Weapon System)		CornerShot	9×19mm	India	Status: In service Developed by DRDO in collaboration with Zen Technologies, can use all pistols in service as main weapon. It is equivalent to Israel's Cornershot
Shotguns
12 Bore PAG		Pump action Shotgun	12-gauge shotgun	India	Status: In service
SSS Defense T12		Semi-automatic Shotgun	12-gauge shotgun	India	Status: On order To be used by Northern Command for anti drone warfare.
Submachine guns
IWI Micro-Uzi "Tivra"	Micro-Uzi	Machine pistol	9×19mm	India; Israel	Status: In service, Micro-Uzi variant is used by Special Forces.
Heckler & Koch MP5	MP5 Submachine Gun	Submachine gun	9×19mm	West Germany	Status: In service, used by Special Forces.
Brügger & Thomet MP9		Submachine gun	9×19mm	Switzerland	Status: In Service. Small number of MP9s in service.
SAF Carbine 2A1	SAF Carbine 2A1	Submachine gun	9×19mm	India; United Kingdom	Status: To be replaced, all the remaining SAF Carbine to be replaced by indigenously built close quarter MSMC
ASMI		Submachine gun	9×19mm	India	Status: In Service. 550 inducted by Para (SF) of the Army.
Taurus T9		Submachine gun	9×19mm	India; Brazil	Status: On order, 550 units ordered.
DRDO Close Quarter Battle carbine		Carbine	5.56×45mm NATO 5.56×45mm INSAS	India	Status: On order. Kalyani Strategic Systems Limited (KSSL) has been selected as the L1 bidder for procurement project of over 4.25 lakh (425,000) carbines. KSSL is the production partner of the DRDO-developed CQB Carbine. A contract worth ₹1,700 crore (equivalent to ₹18 billion or US$190 million in 2026) for 255,128 units was signed on 30 December 2025.
IWI Galil ACE "Adani Jeet"		Carbine	5.56×45mm NATO	Israel India	Status: On order. PLR Systems has been selected as the L2 bidder for procurement project of over 4.25 lakh carbines. Jeet is a derivative of IWI Galil ACE design. A contract worth ₹1,100 crore (equivalent to ₹11 billion or US$120 million in 2026) for 170,085 units was signed on 30 December 2025.
Assault rifles
1B1 INSAS		Assault rifle	5.56×45mm	India	Status: In service (Being phased out), Standard assault rifle of the Indian Army. To be replaced by AK-203 and SIG 716i About 200,000 rifle will be upgraded by Indian army.
AK-203		Assault Rifle	7.62×39mm	India; Russia	Status: In service. In total, 53,000 guns delivered by Indo-Russia Rifles and are reported to be in service. 601,427 rifles have been ordered. This will be the standard service rifle of Indian Army, replacing INSAS
SIG 716i		Battle rifle	7.62×51mm	United States	Status: In service. 66,400 units of SIG 716i in service. Additional 73,000 on order. To be equipped with night sight from MKU.
IMI/IWI Tavor TAR X95 "Zittara" "Abhay"		Bullpup assault rifle	5.56×45mm	India; Israel	Status: In Service, manufactured locally by PLR Systems.
IMI/IWI Tavor TAR-21 "Arka"	IMI Tavor	Bullpup assault rifle	5.56×45mm	India; Israel	Status: In service, Standard Special Forces assault rifle like Para SF, Garud and MARCOS.
M4 carbine	M4A1 Assault Rifle	Assault carbine	5.56×45mm	United States	Status: In service, used by special forces.
AR-M1		Assault rifle	7.62×39mm	Bulgaria	Status: Being Phased Out, used by the Army, to be replaced by AK-203. Some are modified locally by Israel's FAB Defense.
AKM		Assault rifle	7.62×39mm	Soviet Union	Status: Being Phased Out, used by the Army, to be replaced by AK203. Includes variants modified locally by SSS Defence India and Israel's FAB Defense.
MPi-KMS-72		Assault rifle	7.62×39mm	East Germany	Status: Being Phased Out, to be replaced by AK203.
Pistol Mitralieră model 1963/1965		Assault rifle	7.62×39mm	Romania	Status: To be replaced by AK203.
AK-63		Assault rifle	7.62×39mm	Hungary	Status: To be replaced by AK203. In service folding stock variant is used.
Type 56 assault rifle		Assault rifle	7.62×39mm	China	Status: Thousands of captured Type 56s by Indian police/military/paramilitary forces. Some were used by Indian army as a stopgap measure.
Vz. 58		Assault rifle	7.62×39mm	Czechoslovakia	Status: Being phased out, both standard and folding stock variants in use.
Sniper rifles
Dragunov SVD		Designated marksman rifle, Sniper rifle	7.62×54mmR	Soviet Union	Status: In service, Standard designated marksman rifle. Modified locally by Israel's FAB Defense. Around 6,000 units active.
IMI Galil 7.62 Sniper "Archook"	Galil Sniper	Designated marksman rifle, Sniper rifle	7.62×51mm	India; Israel	Status: In service used by Para SF snipers. 200 in service.
Heckler & Koch PSG1		Sniper rifle	7.62×51mm	Germany	Status: In service, Standard semi-automatic sniper rifle.
SIG Sauer SSG 3000	Sniper Rifle	Sniper rifle	7.62×51mm	Germany	Status: In service, Standard bolt-action sniper rifle.
Sako TRG 42		Sniper rifle	.338 Lapua Magnum	Finland	Status: In service, used by special forces and soldiers deployed along the Line of Control (LoC). 1,152 units with 8,45,000 (845,000) rounds bought in three tranches.
Beretta Scorpio TGT		Sniper rifle	.338 Lapua Magnum	Italy	Status: In service, used in small numbers.
Anti-material rifles
Barrett M82		Anti-material rifle	12.7×99mm.416 Barrett	United States	Status: In service, used by special forces
Barrett M95		Anti-material rifle	12.7×99mm	United States	Status: In service, used in small numbers for anti-sniping role in Northern Command.
OSV-96		Anti-material rifle	12.7×108mm	Russia	Status: In service
Denel NTW-20		Anti-material rifle	14.5×114mm 20x82mm	South Africa	Status: In service (400 units)
Vidhwansak		Anti-material rifle	12.7×108mm 14.5×114mm 20x82mm	India	Status: In service
Machine guns
FN Minimi		Light machine gun	5.56×45mm	Belgium	Status: In service, used by special forces.
INSAS LMG		Light machine gun	5.56×45mm	India	Status: In service, to be phased out in favour of Negev NG7.
IMI Negev NG5 "Arun"		Light machine gun	5.56×45mm	India; Israel	Status: In service, Standard Squad Automatic Weapon (SAW) of special forces.
IWI Negev NG7 "Prahar"		Light machine gun	7.62×51mm	India; Israel	Status: In Service, 18,479 in service. 39,000 more on order. Produced by PLR Systems. The MEPRO X6 telescopic sight from Meprolight was selected as the dedicated daytime optic and will be delivered by Bharat Electronics.
MG 2A1 MG 5A MG 6A		Medium machine gun	7.62×51mm	India; Belgium	Status: In service. Domestically license produced by Ordnance Factory Board. Standard medium machine gun for infantry battalions as MG 2A1. Also in service as the MG 5A (Co-axial) and MG 6A (Commander's gun) with some armoured vehicles.
Mk 48 machine gun		Medium machine gun	7.62×51mm	United States; Belgium	Status: In service, with special forces.
PK machine gun		Medium machine gun	7.62×54mmR	India; Soviet Union	Status: In Service, Used by Front line troops as well as Co-axial weapon on Tanks and APC. Locally manufactured at OFB Tiruchirapalli.
Type 80 machine gun		Medium machine gun	7.62×54mmR	China	Status: In Service, Captured from various insurgents in the Kashmir valley and used by Indian troops.
NSV machine gun		Heavy machine gun	12.7×108mm	India; Soviet Union	Status: In Service, Used by Front line troops. Manufactured locally in Ordnance factory Tiruchirapalli
M2 Browning		Heavy machine gun	12.7×99mm	India; United States	Status: In service, M2HB variant in service.
Possible future procurements or currently under trials
Joint Venture Protective Carbine		Carbine	5.56×30mm MINSAS	India	Status: Trials completed. Ready for induction.

=== Explosives ===
Name	Image	Type	Quantity	Origin	Notes
Rifle Grenade		Rifle grenade	N/A	India	Status: In service. Used both with 7.62 mm SLR and 5.56 mm INSAS.
Shivalik		Hand grenade	N/A	India	Status: In service. MoD signed a ₹409 crore (equivalent to ₹525 crore or US$56 million in 2026) deal with Solar Group, Nagpur to buy 1 million grenades. Shivalik grenade is used in hand mode offensive and hand mode defensive. Can be used in rifle mode. Types can be interchanged by changing the outer sleeve of the grenade.
ARDE 40MM UBGL		Grenade launcher (40mm)	N/A	India	Status: In service. Standard under-barrel grenade launcher for INSAS and AK-family rifles in the Indian Army. Manufactured by Ordnance Factory Tiruchirappalli.
Multi grenade launcher 40 mm		Multi grenade launcher (40mm)	N/A	India; South Africa	Status: In service. Semi automatic six shot 40mm × 46mm low velocity grenade launcher. Manufactured at Ordnance Factory Tiruchirappalli.
AGS-30		Automatic grenade launcher	N/A	India; Russia	Status: In service..
AT4CS AST		Recoilless gun (84mm)	N/A	Sweden	Status: In service. Order placed in January 2022. Deliveries completed by February 2025.
Carl Gustav RCL M2/M3/M4		Recoilless rifle (84mm)	N/A	India; Sweden	Status: In service. Carl Gustav Recoilless Rifle produced by OFB. M4 variant used by special forces.
B-300 Shipon		Anti-tank rocket (82mm)	N/A	Israel	Status: In service. Used by special forces.
RPO-A Shmel		Thermobaric rocket launcher (93mm)	N/A	Russia	Status: In service.
C90-CR-RB(M3)		Anti-tank rocket (90mm)	N/A	Spain	Status: In service. Used by special forces.
51 mm E1 mortar		Mortar	N/A	India	Status: In service.
L16 81mm mortar		Mortar	N/A	India	Status: In service.
Mines
NMM-14		Anti-personnel mine		United States	Status: In limited service. Being replaced by Nipun mine.
Nipun		Anti-personnel mine	20 lots	India	Status: In service. Operated by Corps of Engineers with 700,000 on order. The mine is designated as Soft Target Munition and includes a mix of RDX. It was developed by ARDE and HEMRL and is manufactured by private sector companies Economic Explosives Ltd, Nagpur and Premier Explosives Ltd, Secunderabad.
Ulka		Anti-personnel mine	100,000	India	Status: Under development. Designated as Jumping Fragmentation Munition.
Parth		Anti-personnel mine	100,000	India	Status: Under development. Designated as Directional Fragmentation Munition.
Prachand		Anti-tank mine	100,000	India	Status: Under development. Designated as Anti-Tank Munition.
Vibhav		Anti-tank mine	600	India	Status: In service. Designed and developed as Anti-Tank Point Attack Munition by DRDO. In trials with engineer corps in 2021. In production by Kalyani Strategic Systems Ltd. Uses an electronic anti-handling and anti-lift device (EAHALD) and remains active for 120 days after manual or mechanical deployment. Induction continues as of 2026.
Vishal		Anti-tank mine		India	Status: Under development. Designated as Anti-Tank Bar Munition.

== MANPADS ==
Name	Image	Type	Quantity	Origin	Notes
Man-portable air defence systems
FIM-92 Stinger		Man-portable air defense system	245	United States	Status: In service. 245 Stinger Air-to-Air Variant missiles for AH-64E helicopters inducted.
9K38 Igla 9K338 Igla-S		Man-portable air defense system	2500 48 launchers 316 missiles	Russia	Status: In service. Igla-S deployed along LAC. Additional 96 launchers, 300 missiles of Igla-S on order.
Starstreak		Man-portable air defense system		United KingdomIndia	Status: On order. Starstreak is a Laser Beam-Riding MANPAD (LBRM) Very Short Range Air Defence (VSHORAD) Missile. To be delivered by Thales–Bharat Dynamics Limited (BDL) from 2025 onwards with up to 60% indigenous content.
Martlet		Laser-guided battlefield missile (ASM, AAM, SAM and SSM)		United KingdomIndia	Status: On order. $468 million deal signed on 9 October 2025. To be manufactured in Belfast. An Inter-Governmental Agreement (IGA) for domestic production to be signed soon as of August 2026.

== Anti-tank missiles ==
Name	Image	Type	Quantity	Origin	Notes
Man-portable anti-tank systems
9M113 Konkurs-M		Vehicle-mounted and man-portable anti-tank guided missile	25,000+	India; Russia	Status: In service. For BMP-2 (IFV), manufactured locally in India by Bharat Dynamics Limited. The systems were upgraded with Tonbo Imaging's cooled, longwave Infrared (LWIR) thermal imagers known as Sarisa.
MPATGM		Man-portable Anti-tank guided missile		India	Status: Final trial completed and ready for induction. Will replace MILAN-2T and Konkurs with the infantry, parachute, and special forces units.
MILAN-2T		Man-portable Anti-tank guided missile	34,000	India; France; West Germany	Status: In service. Purchased from MBDA and domestically license produced by India's Bharat Dynamics Limited.
9M133 Kornet		Man-portable Anti-tank guided missile	3,000	India; Russia	Status: In service. Man portable and purchased with 250 launchers.
Spike Spike LR-II		Man-portable Anti-tank guided missile	400+	Israel	Status: In service. Army operates more than 400 Spike MR and Spike LR-II missiles while Indian Air Force procured Spike-NLOS for Mi-17 helicopters.
Possible future procurements or currently under trials
Amogha missile		Anti-tank guided missile	—	India	The Amogha will be configured to be used on HAL Rudra and HAL Prachand. Variants will include a land version, an air-launched version and a man-portable version.
FGM-148 Javelin		Anti-tank guided missile	25 launchers & 100 missiles	United States	Possible procurement through fast track route. Contract approved by US DSCA.

== Future procurement and projects ==
The major ongoing weapons programmes of the Indian Army are as follows:

=== Infantry weapons ===
- Sniper Rifles — The MoD released the Request for Proposal in October 2022 to 30 vendors for 4,849 (including 4,549 for the Army, 212 for the Air Force and 88 for the Navy) new sniper rifles in the .338 Lapua Magnum rifle cartridge and for 7,841,575 rounds. These rifles will replace the older Dragunov SVD.
- Anti-materiel rifles — 1000 new anti-material rifles are to be acquired for which the MoD has issued global RFIs.
- Pistols — RFI issued in December 2025 for 100,000 (1 Lakh) 9-mm pistols under Make in India initiative.

=== Anti-tank weapons ===
- MPATGM — Ground and air launched variants. On 10 October 2024, the Indian Army released an Request for Information (RFI) for the acquisition of 20,000 ATGM missiles along with 1,500 next generation ATGM launchers from Indian firms. The information received will be utilised to formulate Army's General Service Quality Requirements (GSQRs) for the ATGM procurement programme. The ATGMs will be procured under the Buy (Indian-IDDM) category, and must be indigenously designed, developed and manufactured with over 60% indigenous content. It should have all-weather and all-terrain firing capability (plains, deserts, high-altitude up to 5,500 m (18,000 ft), coastal as well as island areas). The ATGM probable should be able to destroy enemy tanks, armoured personnel carriers, combat vehicles, low-flying helicopters, concrete structures and other vehicle-based weapon platforms. The Defence Acquisition Council (DAC) of India's Defence Ministry cleared multiple procurement projects including that of MPATGM systems for the Indian Army on 3 July 2026. Other projects approved for the Army also included an anti-UAV electronic warfare system 'Akash Tarang', jet-based kamikaze drone systems and an active protection system for main battle tanks.
- Top-attack anti-tank mine — A Request for Information (RFI) for 4,000 such mines were released on 5 June 2025. Top-attack mines are designed to engage armoured vehicles from above, where protection is typically weaker. They employ a combination of seismic, acoustic, and infrared sensors to detect and classify targets. Upon detection, the mine launches a submunition—such as an explosively formed penetrator (EFP) or shaped charge—in a near-vertical trajectory to penetrate the vehicle's top armour. Some variants use explosively generated shock waves to achieve a similar effect. These mines are effective against heavily armoured platforms that are resistant to conventional underbelly mines and can be deployed in various terrains, including urban environments. The mine should also feature remote activation, deactivation, or self-destruction capabilities to reduce the risk of civilian casualties.

=== Man-portable air defence missiles (MANPADs) ===
- DRDO VSHORADS — The Ministry of Defence released a Request for Proposal (RfP) for the procurement of 48 launchers, 48 night vision sights, 85 missiles, and one missile test station of the infrared (IR) homing-based VSHORADS, designated VSHORADS (New Generation) or VSHORAD (NG). The missile should have flexible deployment including "Manportable configuration or Para dropped operations method, on land and ship based platforms". The system could be used by all three services for day-night terminal and point air defence. The Defence Acquisition Council (DAC) approved the procurement of Very Short-Range Air Defence System (VSHORADS) for the Indian Army and Air Force on 26 October 2026.
- Laser beam riding VSHORAD — DRDO VSHORAD is being built concurrently with another Indian VSHORAD project as a joint venture between a public sector entity based in Hyderabad (possibly Bharat Dynamics Limited) and a private sector entity based in Pune. To counter drones, helicopters, and fighter jets flying at low altitude, the latter missile will be laser beam riding VSHORAD system. An order of 200 launchers and 1200 missiles is expected for this project, which is valued at ₹4,800 crore (equivalent to ₹51 billion or US$550 million in 2026). While Indian Army will procure 700 missiles, the Indian Air Force will procure the rest of it.

== See also ==
- Currently active military equipment by country
- List of regiments of the Indian Army
- Women in the Indian Armed Forces

== Sources ==
- International Institute for Strategic Studies (15 February 2023). The Military Balance 2023. Taylor & Francis. ISBN 978-1-000-91070-4.
