= Trichy assault rifle =

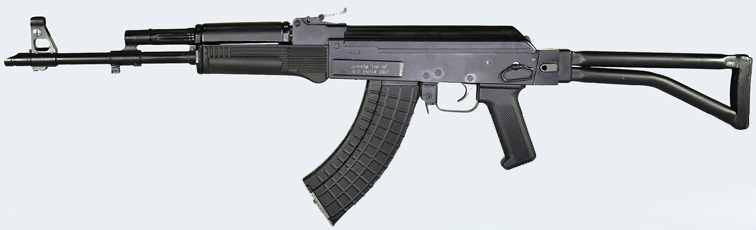
- Trichy production model
- Type: Assault rifle
- Place of origin: India

Service history
- In service: 2017–present
- Used by: India
- Wars: Naxalite–Maoist insurgency

Production history
- Designer: Ordnance Factory Tiruchirappalli; Advanced Weapons and Equipment India
- Designed: 2011–2015
- Manufacturer: Ordnance Factory Tiruchirappalli; Advanced Weapons and Equipment India
- Produced: 2017–present
- Variants: See Variants

Specifications
- Mass: 3.4 kg (7.5 lb) (TAR); 3.17 kg (7.0 lb) (TriCa)
- Length: 900 mm (35 in) (Trichy Folding Stock Top)
- Barrel length: 650 mm (25.6 in) (Trichy Folding Stock Top)
- Cartridge: 7.62×39mm
- Caliber: 7.62
- Action: Gas-operated reloading
- Rate of fire: 600 rounds/min (Full automatic)
- Muzzle velocity: 710–715 m/s (2,330–2,350 ft/s)
- Effective firing range: 300–350 m (330–380 yd) (TAR); 140 m (150 yd) (TriCa)
- Maximum firing range: 150–175 m (164–191 yd) (TriCa)
- Feed system: 30-round detachable box magazine
- Sights: Scopes with picatinny rail (If customised from order)

The Trichy assault rifle (TAR), sometimes known as the Tiruchi assault rifle, is an Indian-made assault rifle chambered for the 7.62×39mm round. The TAR is based on the AR-M1, produced by Bulgarian manufacturer Arsenal AD. Developed between 2011 and 2015, Ordnance Factory Tiruchirappalli (OFT) began manufacturing TARs in 2017.

The TAR was developed to reduce dependence on imported AR-M1s under the Atmanirbhar Bharat self-reliance policy. The TAR has been adopted by most Indian law enforcement agencies.

== History ==
=== Background ===
Prior to the TAR's introduction, India largely used foreign-made AK-style rifles. Around 500,000 M1s were reportedly imported by India from Bulgaria in 2021 for use by the Central Armed Police Forces (CAPF) and Indian police forces. As of May 2025, India is the second-largest arms importer after Ukraine, accounting for 8.3% of the arms trade, according to research data from the Stockholm International Peace Research Institute. To reduce dependence on importing small arms from other countries, part of the Atmanirbhar Bharat policy called for self-sufficiency to manufacture firearms in India.

OFT announced the manufacture of an indigenous AK-based assault rifle in 2011. The AR was named Trichy after OFT to recognise the factory's contribution in developing and manufacturing the rifle. Some TARs were made in 2012 to be tested. These early TARs were tested by the Border Security Force (BSF), the Central Reserve Police Force (CRPF), the Indo-Tibetan Border Police and the Sashastra Seema Bal.

Development started in 2015 with a production line established in 2017. That March, 200 TARs were acquired by the Chhattisgarh Police as part of the 216th Ordnance Factories Day celebration. Concerns were raised at the time, prior to manufacture, that OFT was experiencing manpower decline, leading to a decline of employees at the company. The All India Defence Employees Federation, the Indian National Defence Workers' Federation, and the Bharatiya Pratiraksha Mazdoor Sangh stated their opposition to importing small arms with the unions hoping that more orders for the TAR would be approved, retaining employees at OFT.

=== Adoption ===
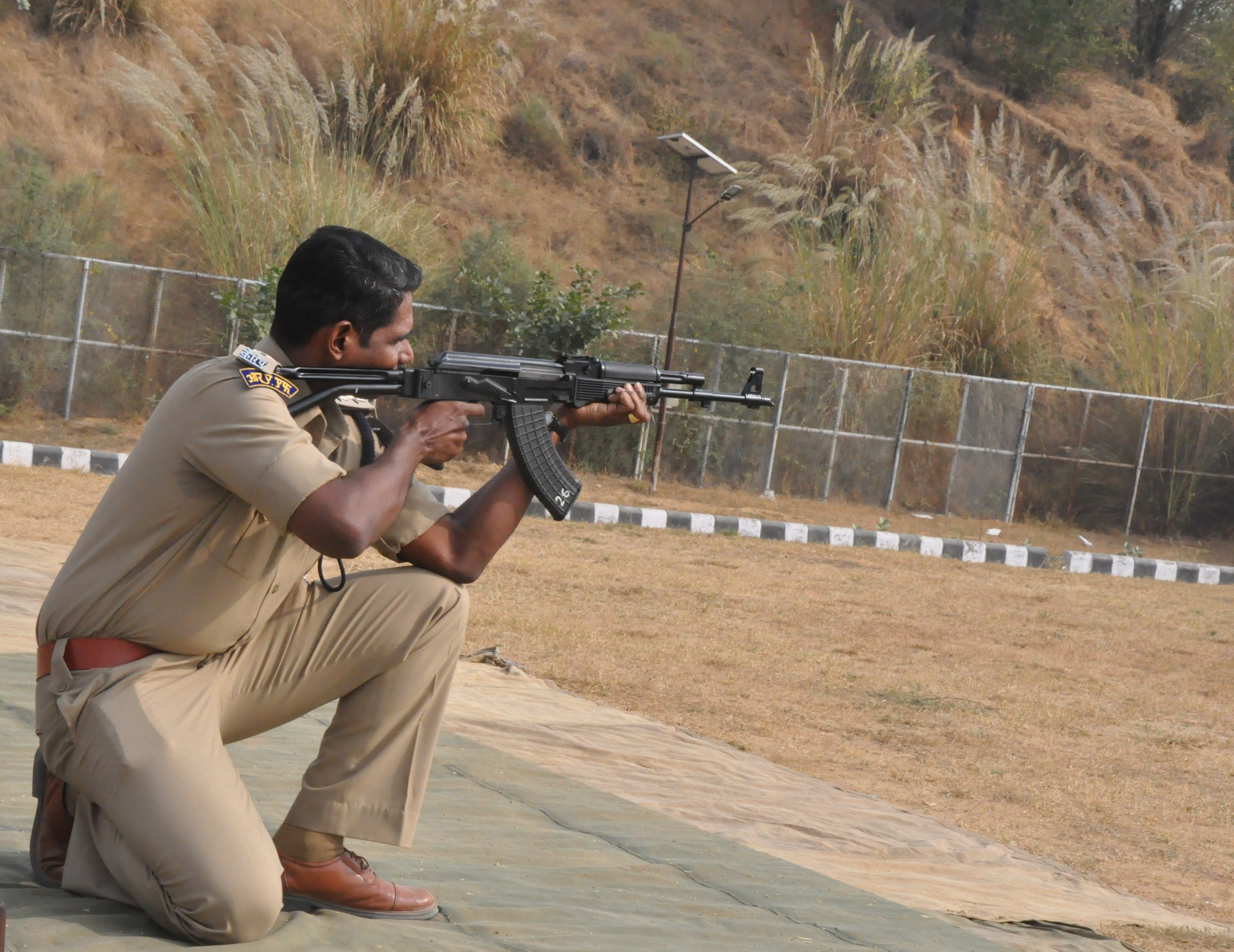
A CISF officer practices with the TAR at a shooting range.

In November 2017, the CRPF conducted field tests to determine the suitability of the TAR with 15,000 rounds fired at the CRPF Academy in Kadarpur, Haryana with no reports of the rifle jamming. Other tests conducted included the TAR being fired from mud, rain and saltwater and from being dropped to test reliability and accuracy. 100 TARs were ordered afterwards. In February 2018, further tests were conducted by the CRPF at Jagdalpur, Raipur, Guwahati and Srinagar with an order of 6,167 TARs placed afterwards. At the time, the CRPF tested the Trichy with the Ghatak, the Joint Venture Protective Carbine and the INSAS1C. In March 2020, the CRPF acquired the first 500 out of 6,167 TARs sold to them.

In January 2019, the TAR was delivered to the BSF, with its Additional Director General Nasir Kamal receiving the first rifle from the Ordnance Factory Board's Director General Saurabh Kumar. It was reported in the same month that the Jharkhand Police would acquire TARs for anti-Naxalite operations. The TAR was displayed for the first time at the Pragati Maidan in New Delhi for the 5th International Police Expo and the 4th India Homeland Security Expo. In February 2020, the TAR was on public display at the Defence Expo at Lucknow, Uttar Pradesh. It was reported at the time that the TAR was offered to the Indian Army. OFT reported in March 2021 that around 11,500 TARs were supplied for a total of Rs 1.60 billion during fiscal year 2020–21.

In January 2021, the TriCa (Trichy Carbine) Carbine was unveiled. Tests were conducted where 2,000 rounds were fired with no stoppages. That August, OFT announced that the TAR could use the ARDE Under Barrel Grenade Launcher, which was presented by OFT general manager Sanjay Dwivedi. A TAR variant with a downfolding stock was presented publicly. This variant was sought out by the Railway Protection Force aside from the CAPFs. In December 2021, the National Security Guard placed an order of 100 TriCa carbines. In April 2022, the Kerala Police (KP) ordered 92 TriCa carbines. According to OFT, the Greyhounds unit ordered 44 TARs. In July 2022, the Government of Kerala received a request from KP to procure 250 TARs with side folding stocks; they received the TriCa carbines in May 2025. According to the Advanced Weapons and Equipment India's (AWEIL) 2022–2023 Annual Report, the National Security Guard and the Andhra Pradesh Police conducted tests on both the TAR and the TriCa carbine.

In January 2023, the Central Industrial Security Force (CISF) received TARs manufactured from Rifle Factory Ishapore. That April, Minister of State for Defence and Tourism Ajay Bhatt visited OFT, where he witnessed the TAR being manufactured in the factory while briefed on OFT's research and development work. The following January, BSF procured further TARs featuring bayonets. The Government of Kerala published an approved plan for the KP to acquire 30 TARs. In November 2023, the Trichy was on display at the Dasara Exhibition in Mysore, Karnataka as part of an effort to raise awareness on crime and public safety. In a July 2024 interview with Rajesh Choudhary, chairman and managing director of AWEIL, he said that the TAR continues to be in demand with CAPFs and reported that an export order was made for the rifle.

In May 2025, it was reported that the Assam Forest Department and the Central Bureau of Narcotics made orders for the TriCa carbine. In December 2025, the Kolkata Police announced that the force will adopt the Trichy to replace their Lee–Enfield .303 rifles.

=== Development ===
Initial versions of the TAR were produced by using FN FAL-based receivers and were using 7.62x39 mm magazines. In 2012, there were reports that the prototypes jammed during testing due to the rate of fire being 800 rounds per minutes instead of 600 rounds per minute to match with the AK-47. It was initially expected that the rate of fire would be at 650 rounds per minute.

The current version of the TAR is based on the AR-M1 with a machined receiver instead of stamped sheet to ensure the rifle has high accuracy and reliability. The TAR can be outfitted with picatinny rails on the upper handguard to attach scopes if requested.

=== Combat use ===
In July 2021, it was reported that the TARs used by the Kerala Police are effective in Naxalite-Maoist counterinsurgency operations.

In August 2025, a TAR was secured from pro-Maoist communist Naxalite fighters in Chhattisgarh's Narayanpur district.

== Design ==
The TAR can fire with single, burst and full automatic mode. OFT reported that the TAR can be adopted with single shot mode only for police forces in cities and urban areas. While it has an effective range of 300 to 350 metres, the range can be up to 500 metres if the rifle is used in full auto.

OFT claimed that the TAR is functionally on par with the AK-47.

=== Accessories ===
The TAR can be equipped with several underbarrel grenade launchers, including the ARDE UBGL, the GP-25, the GP-30 and the Arsenal M6 UBGL. The TAR can use bayonets.

=== Magazines ===
Magazines for the TAR are supplied by Nilkamal Limited. Magazines made for AK-47-based assault rifles can also be used.

=== Ammunition ===
7.62×39 mm ammunition of all types can be used for the TAR.

== Variants ==
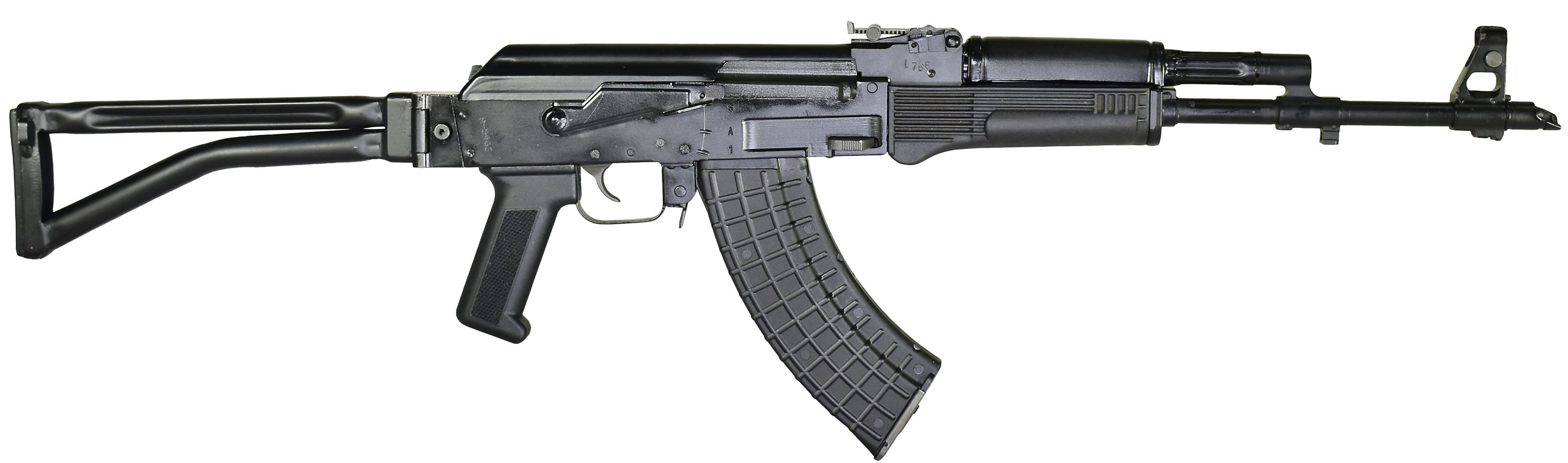
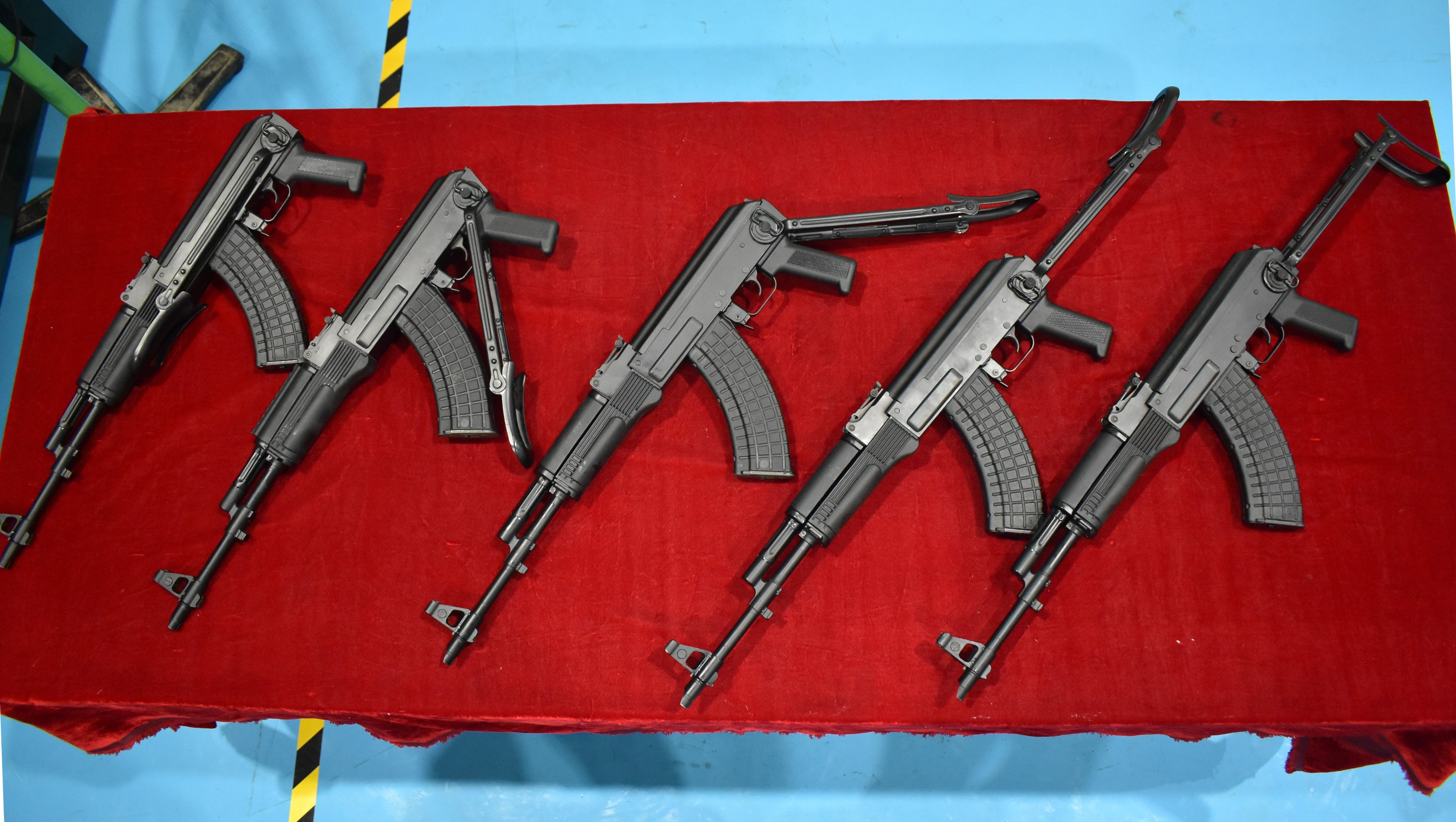
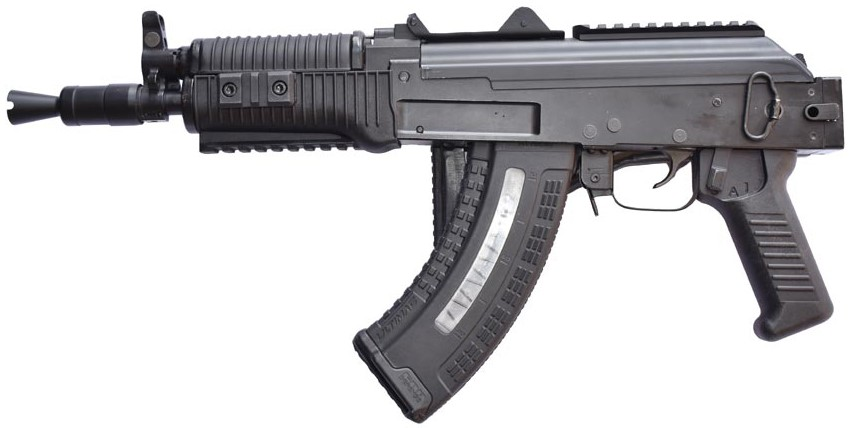
TAR variants. From top to bottom: TAR side folding stock, TAR down folding stock and TriCa carbine.

=== Trichy assault rifle ===
Main variant with a fixed stock. A telescopie M4-type stock can also be used.

=== Trichy folding stock (side) ===
TAR variant with a side folding stock.

=== Trichy folding stock (down) ===
Unveiled in August 2021, it is a TAR variant with a downfolding stock.

It's sometimes referred to as a variant with an underfolding stock.

=== Trichy Carbine (TriCa) ===
Unveiled in January 2021, the TriCa weights 3.17 kg and is marketed as a compact weapon for vehicle crews, paratroopers and special forces units. The TriCA's firing range is from 150 to 175 metres. A muzzle device is installed on the barrel to minimize muzzle flash and sound when it's fired.

The TriCa is a clone based on the Arsenal AR-M14SF, but the muzzle device is based on the AKS-74U. (Note: Mil Mag erroneously referred to it as the AKMS-74U.)

It is sometimes known as Baby TAR or TAR-3.

== Users ==
- India:
  - Border Security Force
  - Central Industrial Security Force
  - Central Reserve Police Force
  - Chhattisgarh Police
  - Greater Mumbai Police
  - Indo-Tibetan Border Police
  - Jharkhand Police
  - Kerala Police
  - Kolkata Police
  - Madhya Pradesh Police
  - National Security Guard
  - Rajasthan Police
- Unnamed country: Rajesh Choudhary of AWEIL reported an export order from an unnamed country.

=== Non-state actors ===
- People's Liberation Guerrilla Army (India): At least one Trichy recovered from Naxalite guerrillas.
