= Ordnance Factory Tiruchirappalli =

Defence Production Company of India

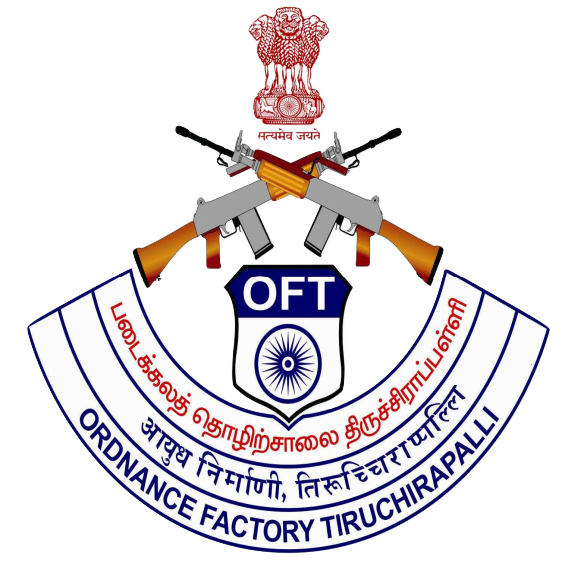
- Type: Government Organisation
- Industry: Defence
- Founded: Tiruchirappalli, India (1966)
- Key people: Shirish Khare, IOFS (General Manager)
- Products: Small arms
- Number of employees: ~1500
- Parent: Advanced Weapons and Equipment India Limited (current); Ordnance Factory Board (former)

Ordnance Factory Tiruchirappalli (OFT), also called Ordnance Factory Trichy, is a small arms factory operated by Advanced Weapons and Equipment India Limited based in Tiruchirappalli, Tamil Nadu, which was previously part of Ordnance Factory Board of the Ministry of Defence, Government of India. The company is headed only by an IOFS officer called General Manager (ex officio Additional Secretary to Government of India) who is the chief executive officer, responsible for the overall management of the company.

OFT is the largest small arms manufacturing company of India and has the most varied range.

== History ==
Ordnance Factory Tiruchirapalli was in need after the Indo-Pakistani War of 1965. It was inaugurated on 3 July 1966 by the then Prime Minister of India, Indira Gandhi, and production began in 1967. It was established to increase the small arms production in the country, assisting Rifle Factory Ishapore and Small Arms Factory, Kanpur.

== Products ==
OFT started its production with 9 mm carbines and now manufactures arms ranging from 5.56 mm rifles to rocket launchers, shell launchers, grenade launchers, aviation armament, naval armament, tank armament, anti-aircraft guns, autocannons, automatic rifles, and sniper rifles.

- IOF .315 sporting rifle - A civilian version of the British Lee–Enfield rifle, chambered in the 8×50mmR Mannlicher cartridge, rather than the .303 British cartridge.
- INSAS rifle - The INSAS (Indian Small Arms System) 5.56 mm assault rifle is the standard-issue rifle of the Indian Army. At least 300,000 of these weapons have been sold to the Indian Army.
- 7.62 mm 1A1 rifle - Licence produced variant of the British L1A1 self-loading rifle. It was the standard-issue rifle of the Indian Army and has been replaced by the INSAS.
- 7.62 mm PKT gun - Indian license produced variant of PKT machine gun mounted on main battle tanks such as Arjun, Ajeya, Bhishma of the Indian Army.
- 7.62 mm Trichy Assault Rifle - A 7.62 mm calibre assault rifle developed by Ordnance Factory Trichy. In use by paramilitary forces such as CRPF, CISF, BSF, etc. Also in use with the State Police Forces of Madhya Pradesh, Maharashtra, Rajasthan, Kerala, Jharkhand, Chhattisgarh, among others.
- 12.7 mm NSV Heavy Machine Gun - A heavy machine gun, manufactured by OFT, which can be mounted on helicopters, besides land and sea applications.
- 14.5 mm sub caliber device - A training weapon for the crew of T-72 tank for 125 mm gun, in range practice against standard targets, using 14.5 mm armour piercing incendiary tracer bullet with steel case.
- 14.5 mm KPV Heavy Machine Gun
- Vidhwansak anti-materiel rifle - An anti-materiel sniper rifle developed by OFT. In use with the Border Security Force. The Vidhwansak can be easily changed between three calibers (12.7 mm, 14.5 mm and 20 mm) by replacing the barrel, bolt, magazine and scope without any specialized tools.
- GSh-23 aircraft cannon - An autocannon, for use onboard aircraft. The Ghasha is the gun used on aircraft like the Tejas, MiG-21, MiG-27 and Mi-24 helicopters.
- 30 mm automatic cannon 2A42 - Installed in a two-person turret on the Sarath mechanised infantry combat vehicle (ICV) and ships.
- 30 mm auto grenade launcher - provides better mobility, longer range, increased rate of fire, and better accuracy during firing. Significantly lighter than its previous version but far more advanced and powerful, it can engage targets at over 2000m. Recoil is lessened.
- 38 mm multi-shell launcher (UGRA) - used to launch tear gas shells for riot control.
- ARDE Under Barrel Grenade Launcher - An under-barrel grenade launcher, developed by ARDE and OFT for use with INSAS rifles. It is also compatible with the AK-47s in service with the Indian Army.
- 40 mm multi grenade launcher - A variety of rounds such as HE, HEAT, anti-riot baton, irritant, and pyrotechnic can be loaded and fired as fast as the trigger can be pulled; the cylinder can be loaded or unloaded rapidly to maintain a high rate of fire.
- Joint Venture Protective Carbine (JVPC)
- Multi Caliber Individual Weapon System
- TriCa carbine
- Pistol Auto 9mm 1A
- IOF.32 Revolver
- 51 mm Mortar
- 81 mm Mortar
- 84 mm Rocket Launcher M4
- Rocket-propelled grenade launcher RPG-7
- Stabilized Remote Control Gun System (SRCG)

== Technology ==
OFT currently manufactures some products under license from the foreign companies that produce them. It is working closely with the Armament Research and Development Establishment and other laboratories and establishments of the Defence Research and Development Organisation (DRDO) to indigenise the weapons.

== Customers ==
OFT mainly manufactures weapons for the

- Indian Armed Forces
- Central Armed Police Forces
- State Armed Police Forces
- Paramilitary Forces of India
- Special Forces of India.
- OFT also manufactures weapons for civilians in India.

Weapons manufactured by OFT, such as the INSAS rifles, have been exported to several countries.

== Gallery ==
Products
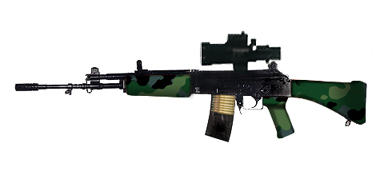
5.56 mm INSAS Rifle

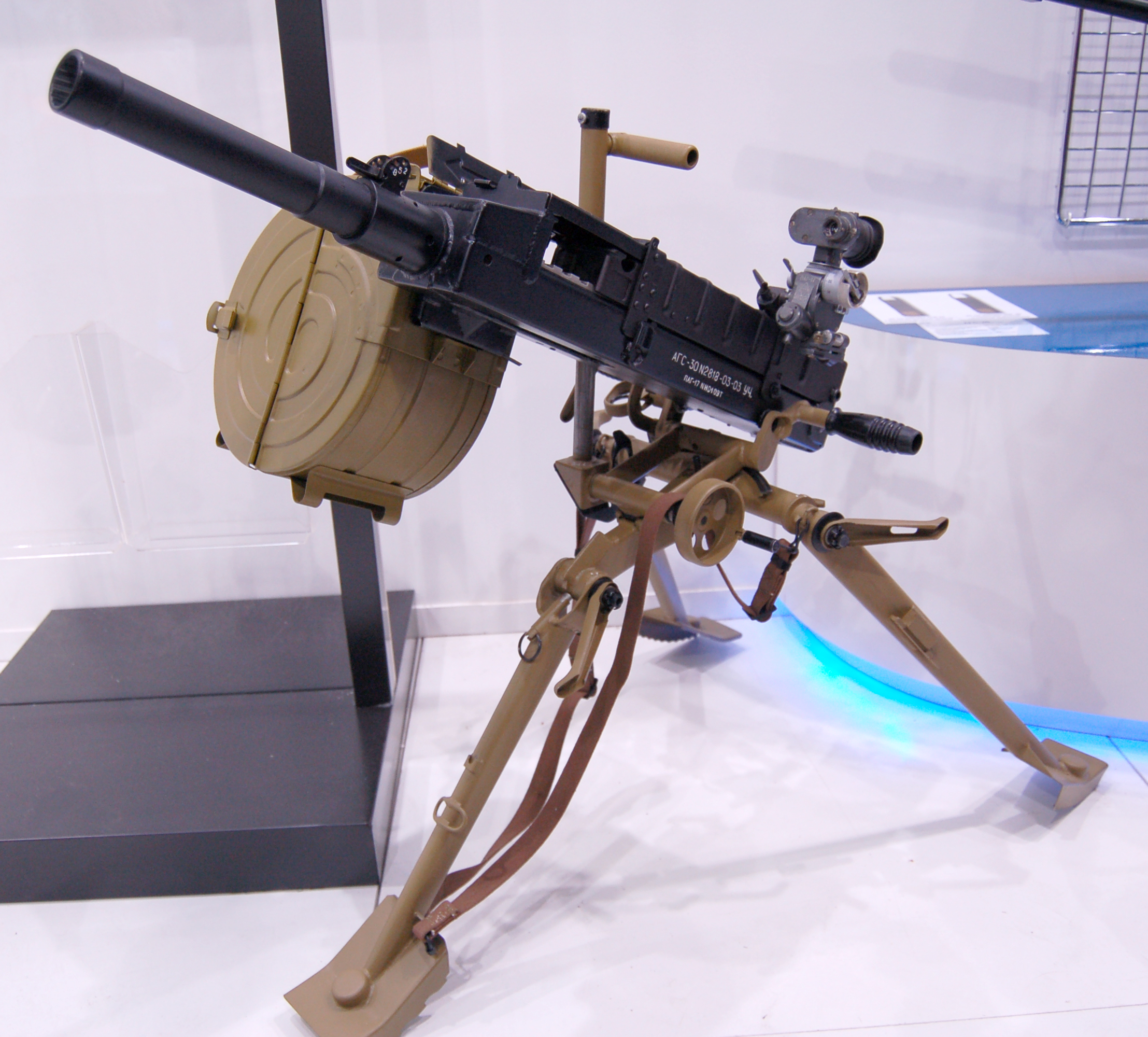
30 mm Auto Grenade Launcher

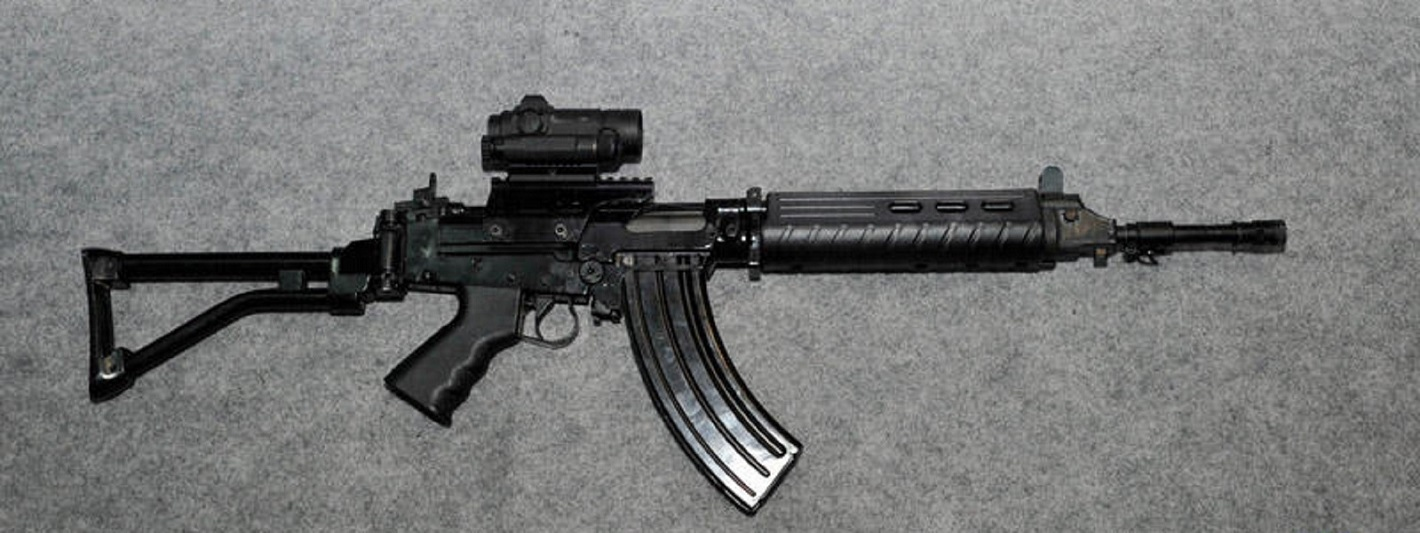
7.62 mm Trichy Assault Rifle (TAR)

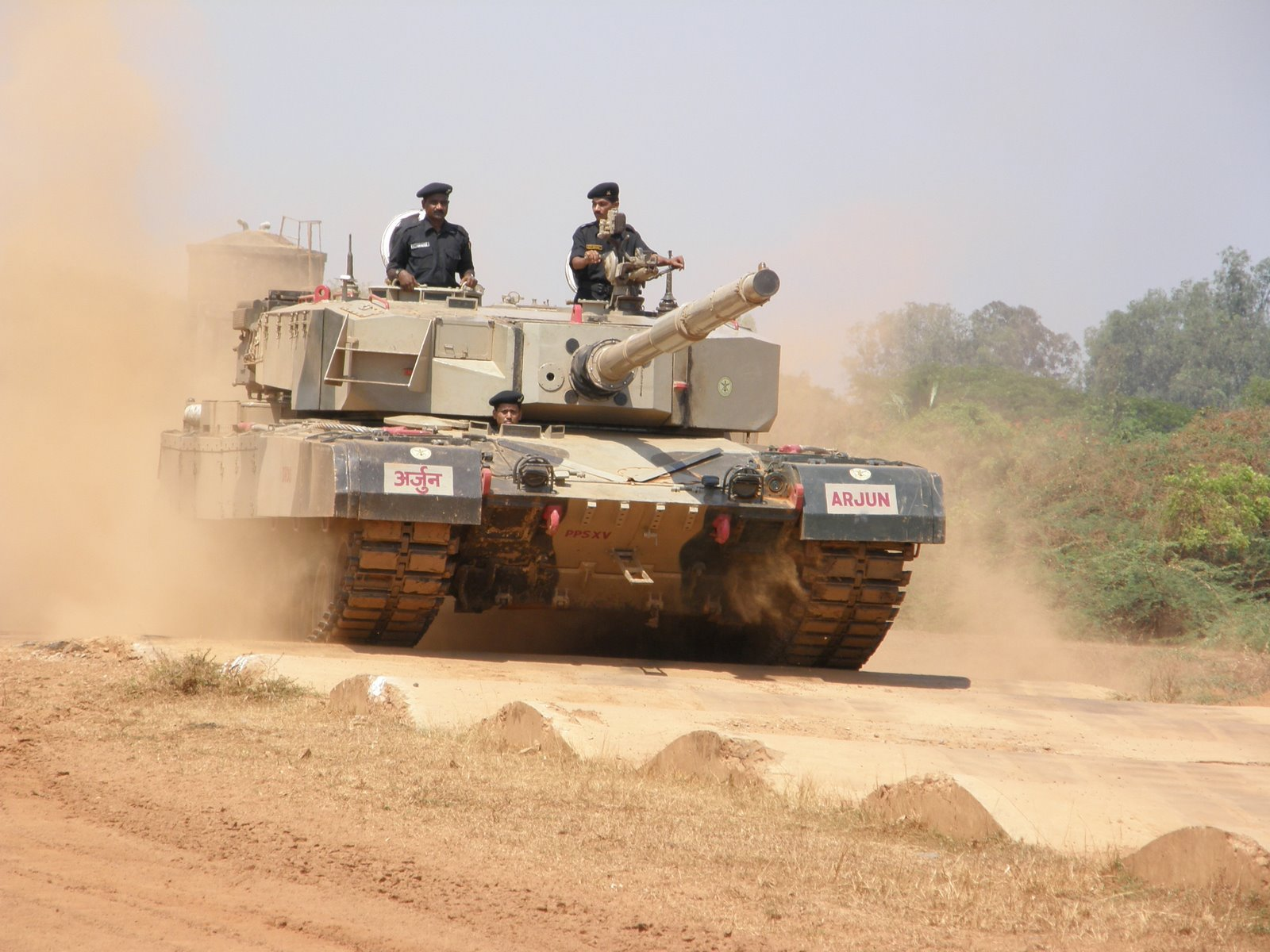
Arjun is armed with a 12.7 mm anti-aircraft machine gun and a 7.62 mm coaxial machine gun

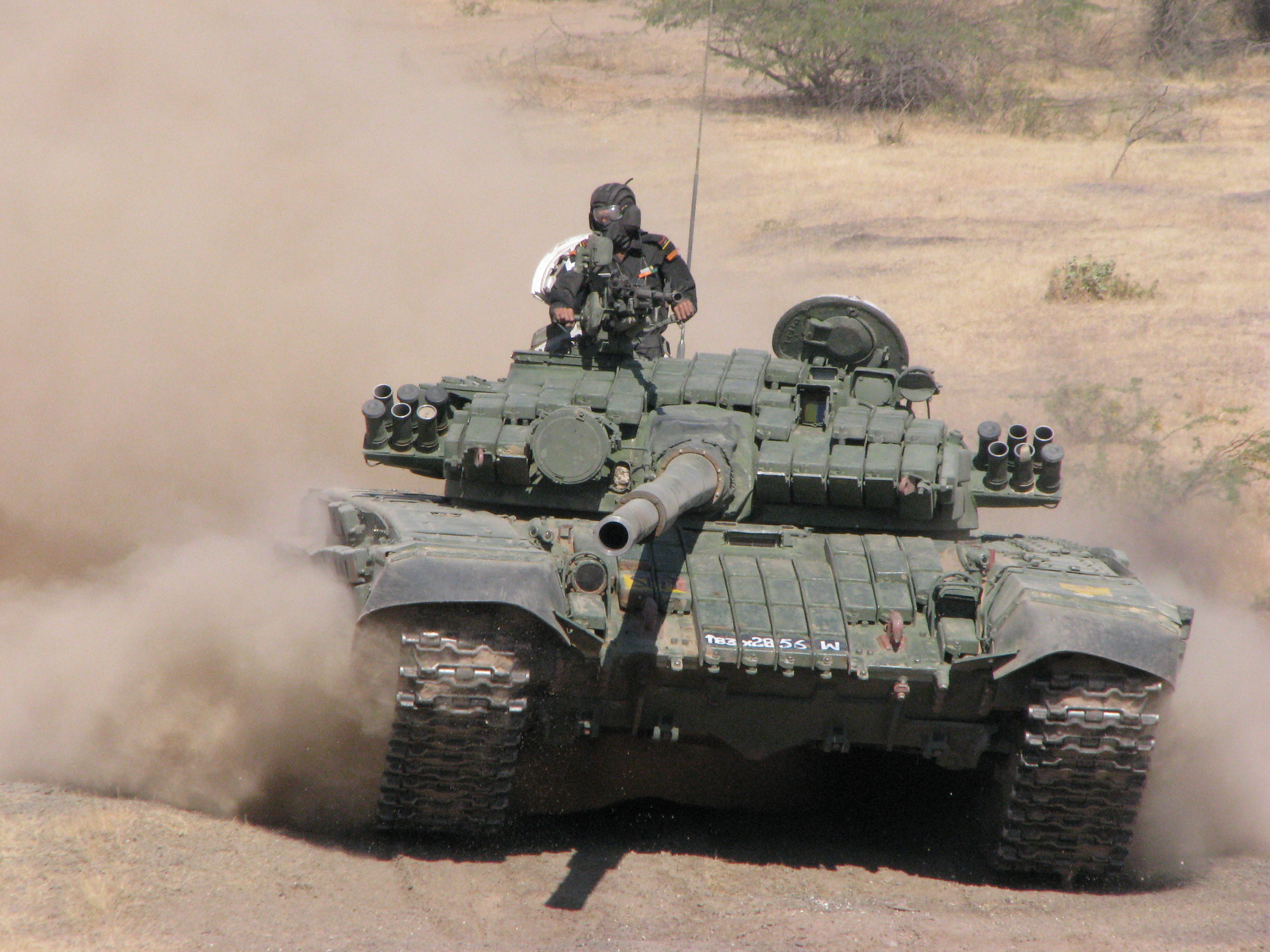
Ajeya of the Indian Army has a 7.62 mm PKT coaxial machine gun and a 12.7 mm anti-aircraft machine gun

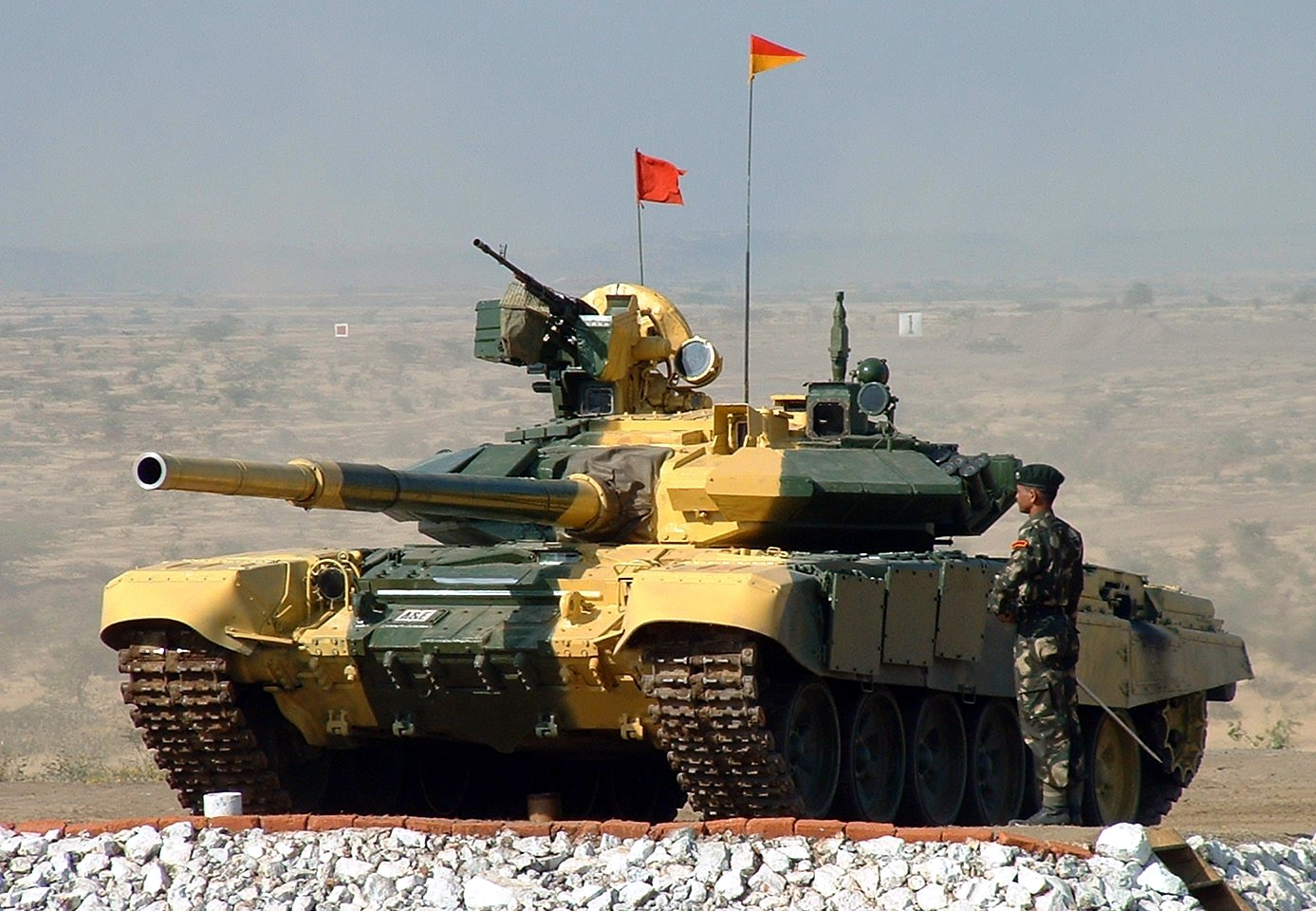
Bhishma has secondary armaments like the 12.7 mm AA machine gun and PKT 7.62 mm coaxial machine gun.

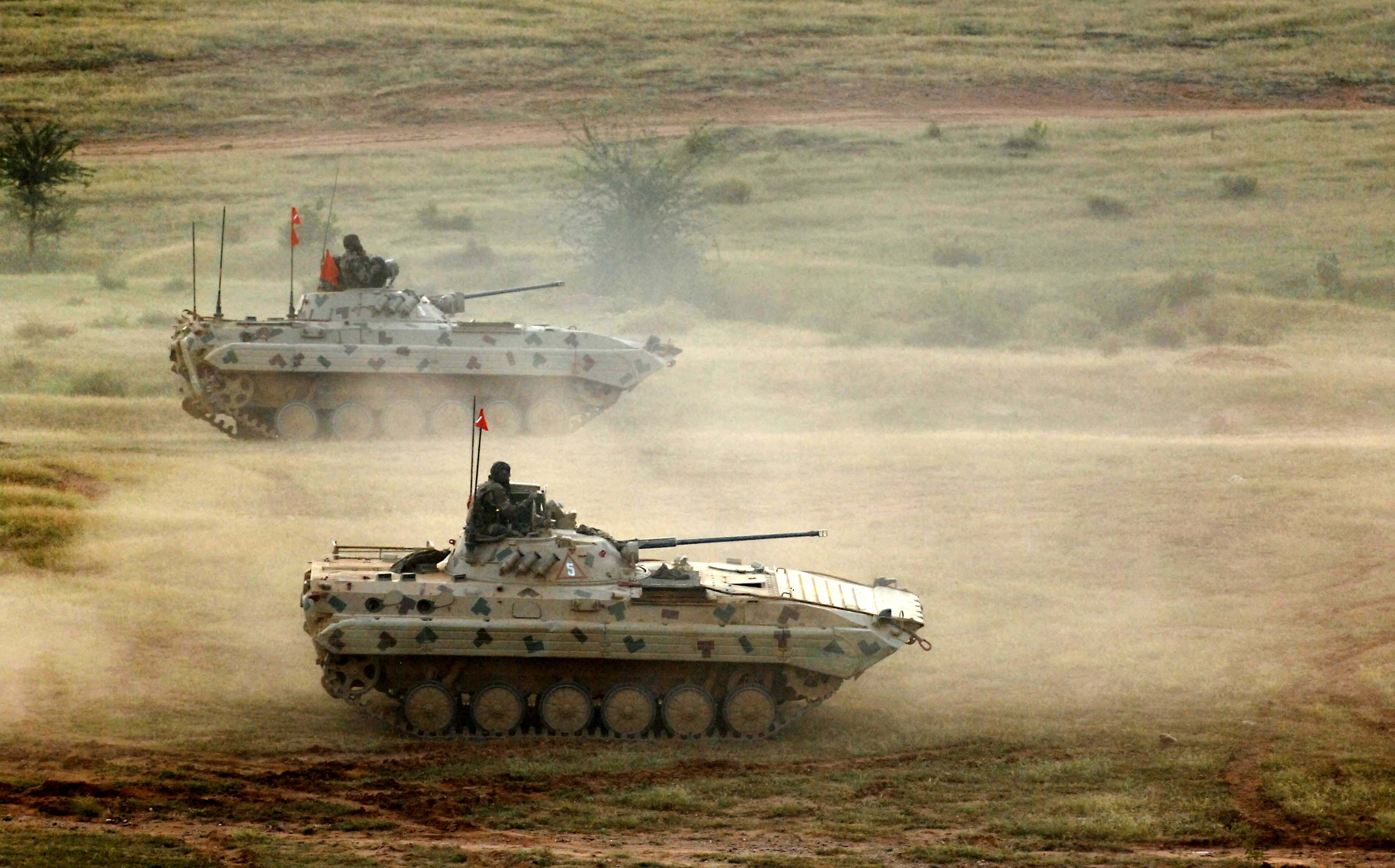
Sarath uses 30 mm Cannon and 7.62 mm PKT Gun

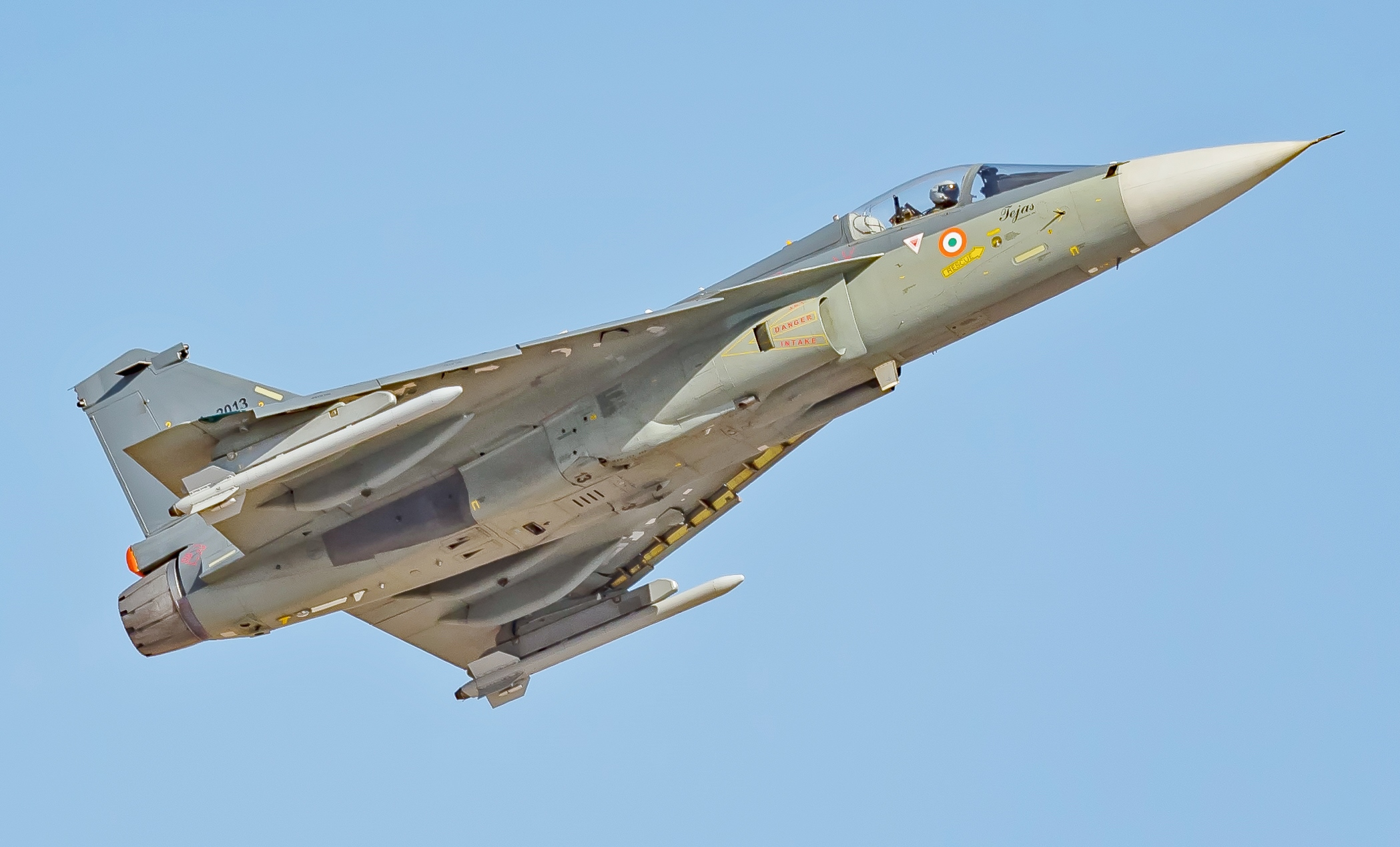
Tejas uses armaments such as 23 mm GSh-23 aircraft autocannon

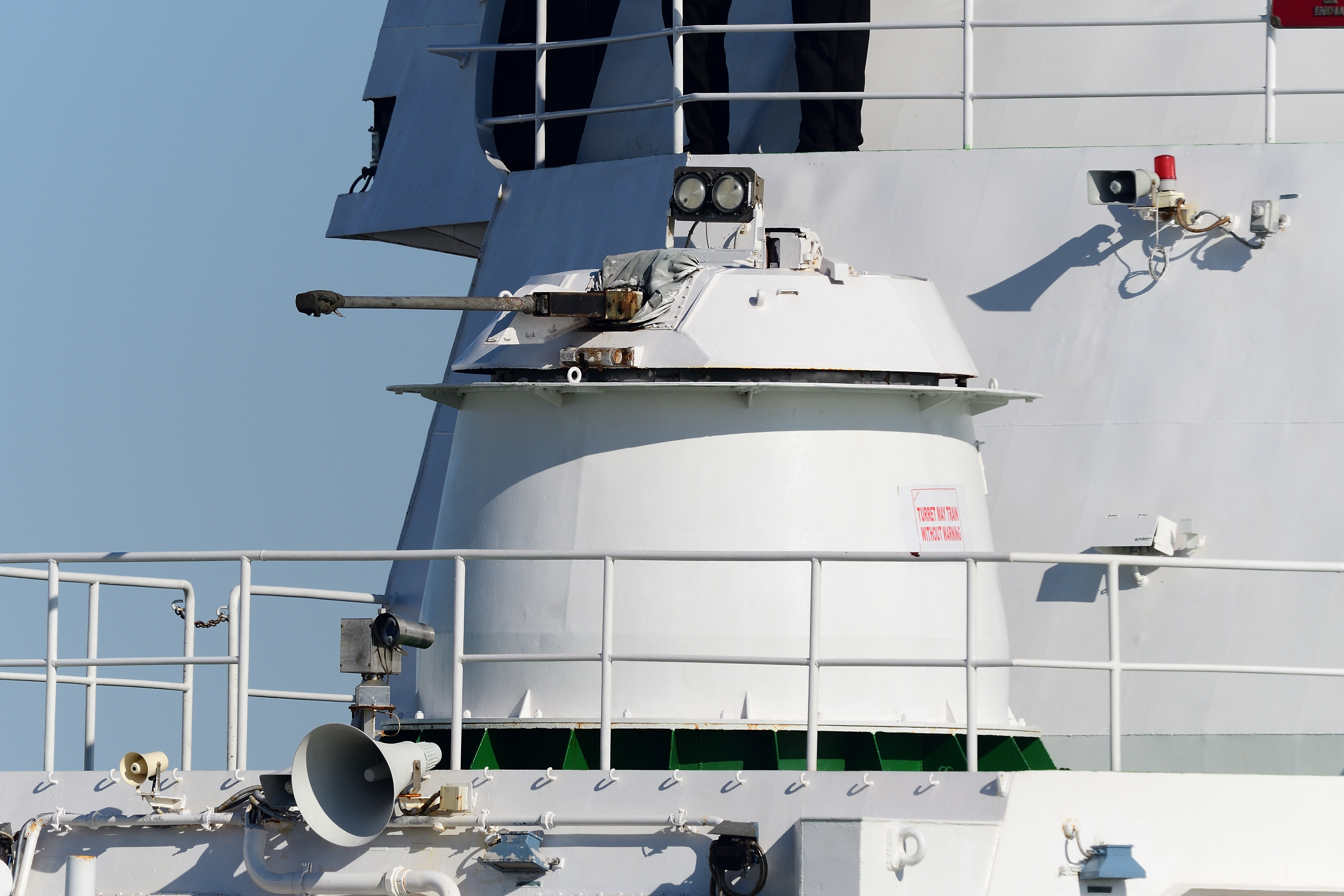
CRN 91 Naval Gun is the main armament of Indian Naval and Coast Guard ships and patrolling vessels

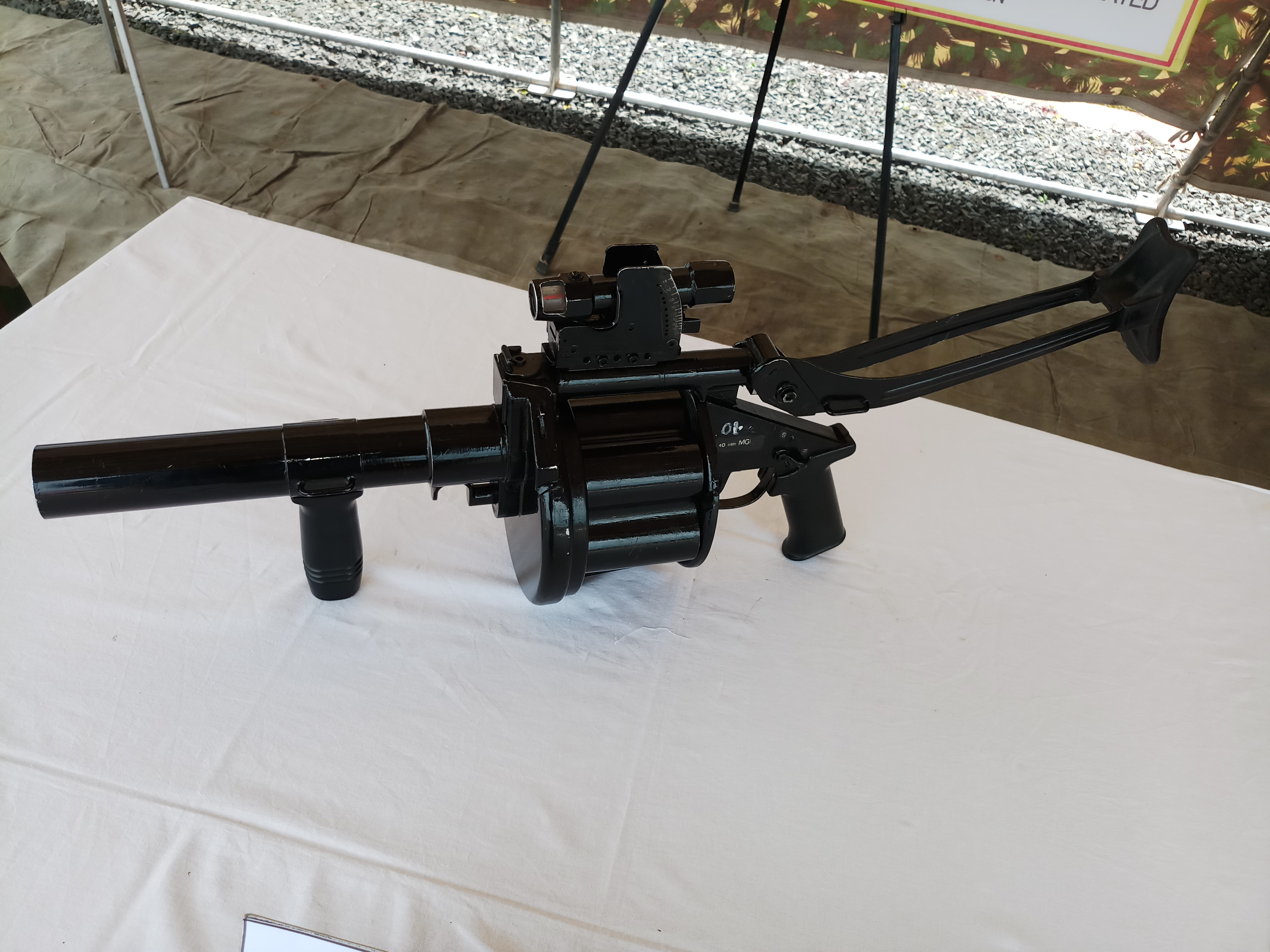
40 mm Multi Grenade Launcher (MGL)

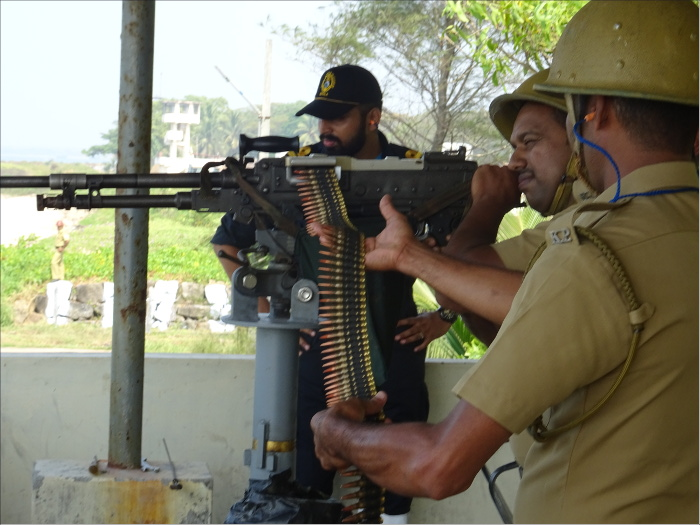
7.62 mm Anti-aircraft Gun

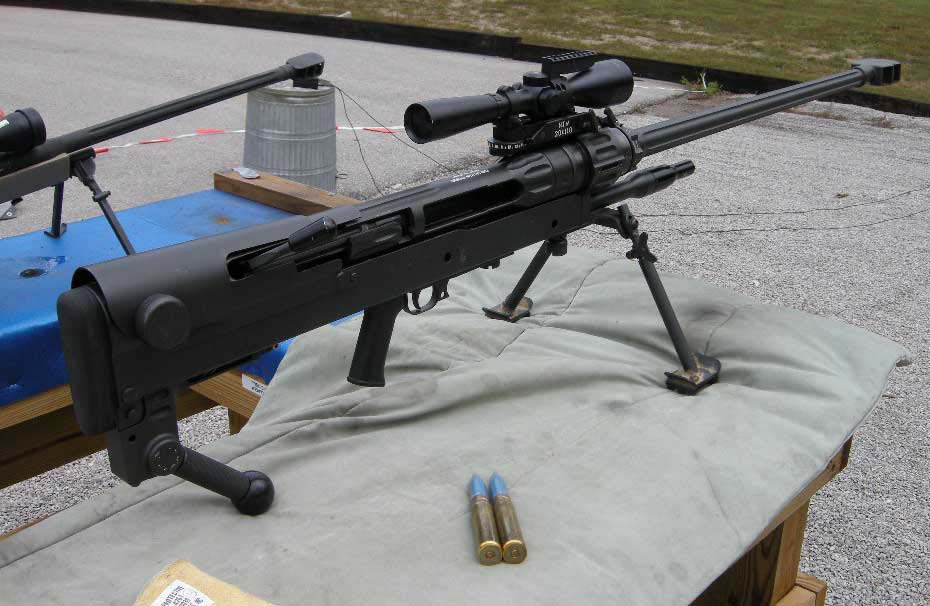
Vidhwansak Multi-Calibre Anti-Material Sniper Rifle

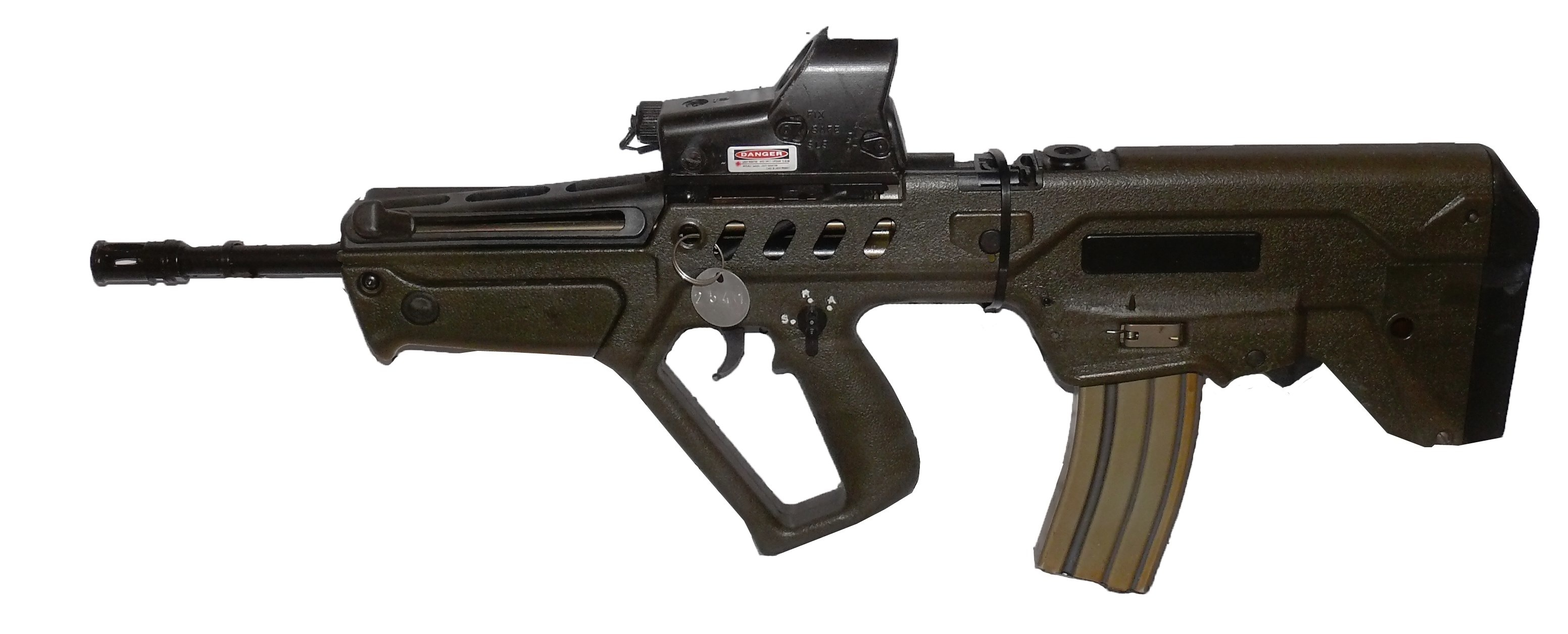
Zittara Multi-purpose Carbine

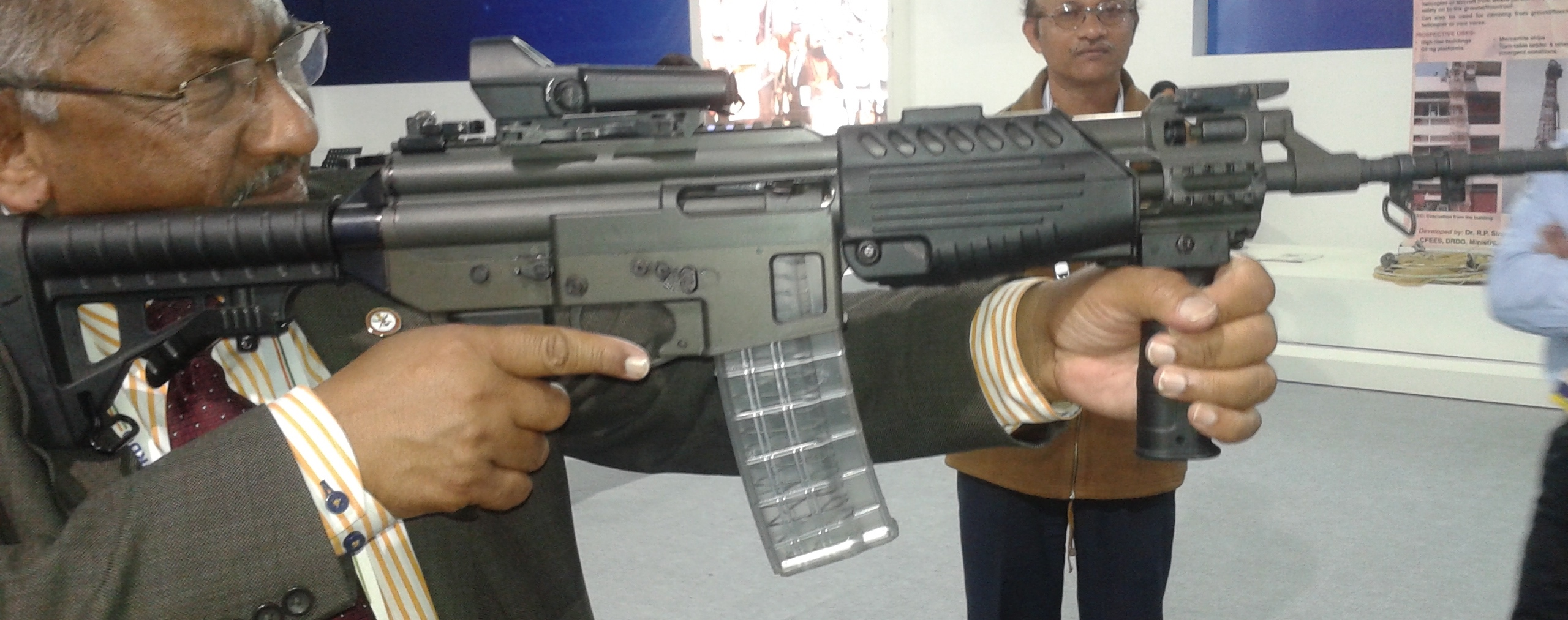
Multi Caliber Individual Weapon System

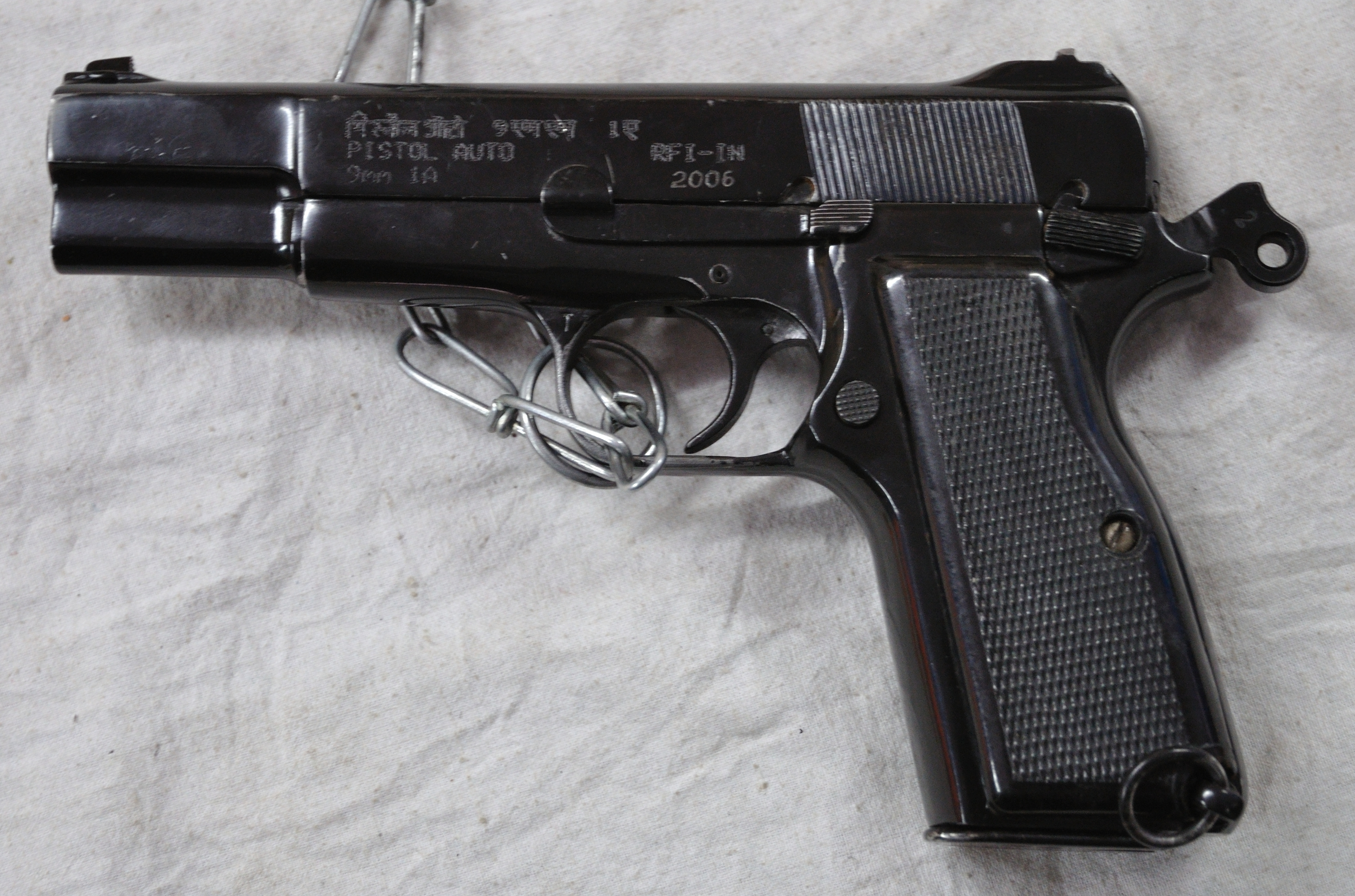
Pistol Auto 9 mm 1A

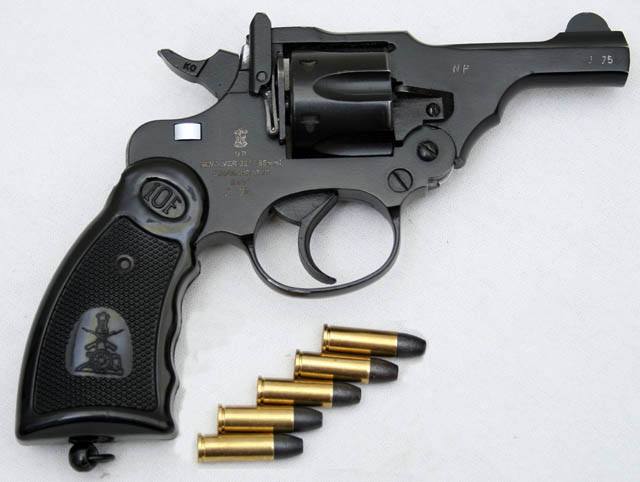
IOF .32 Revolver

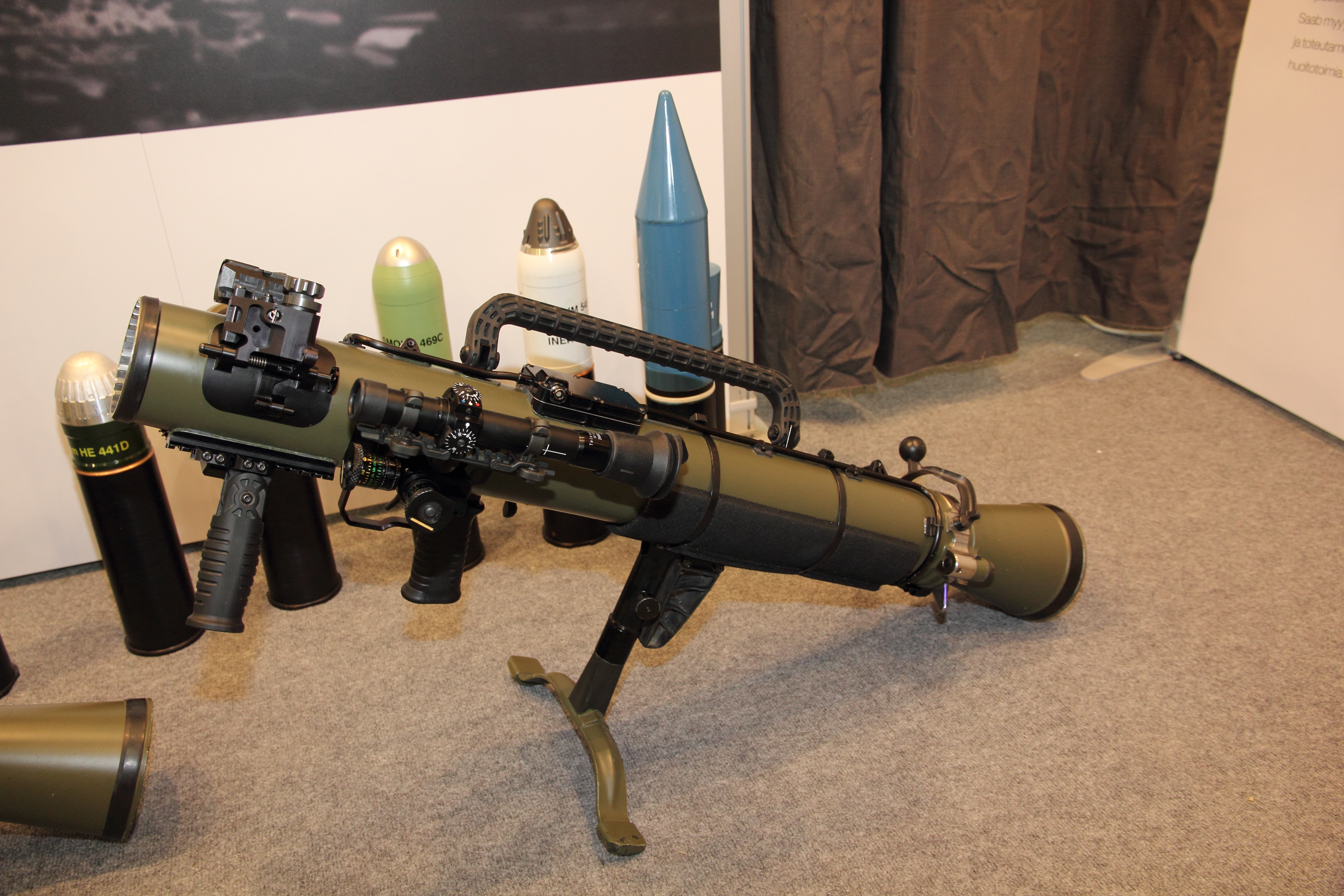
84 mm Rocket Launcher M4

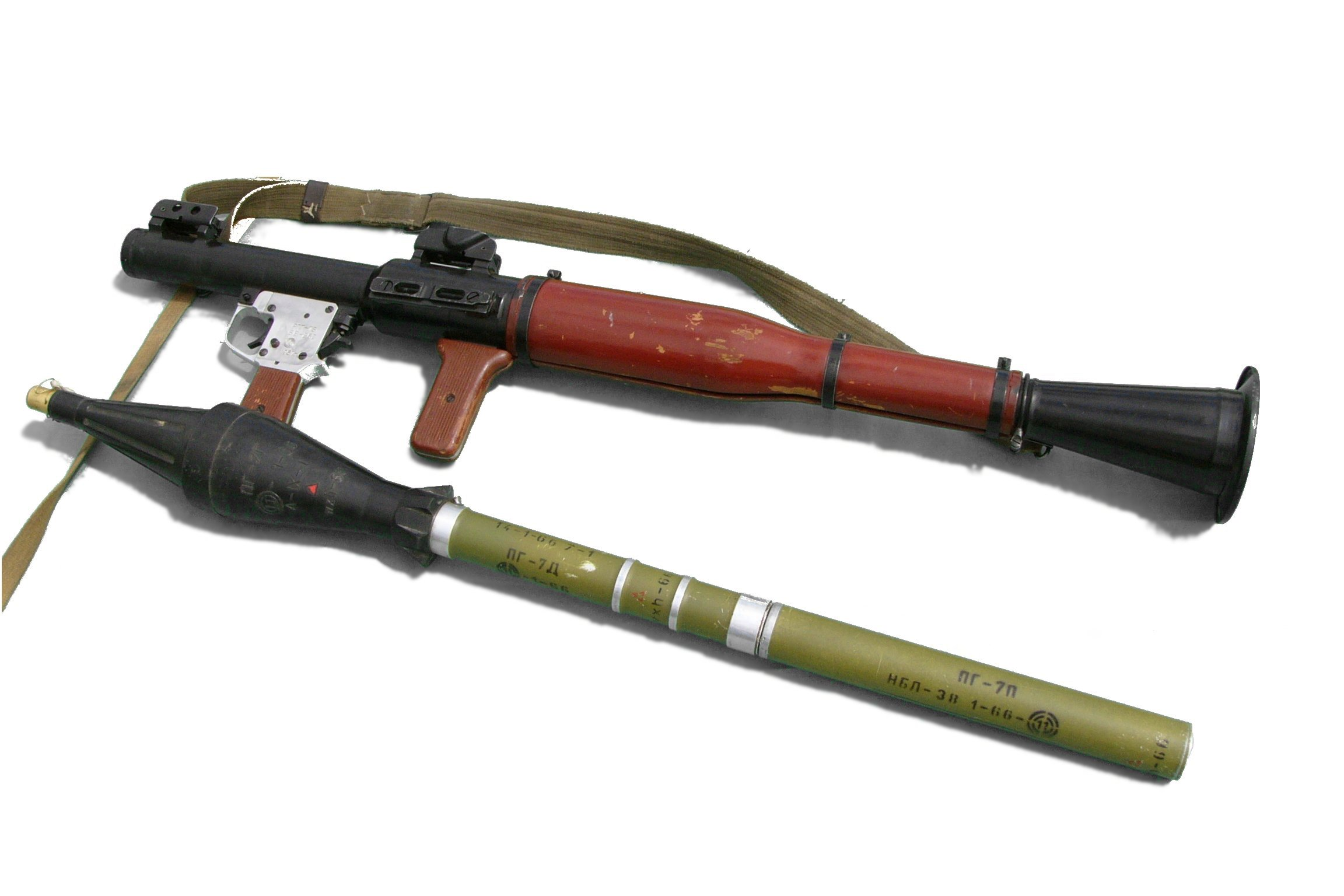
Rocket-propelled grenade launcher RPG-7
