= Excalibur rifle =

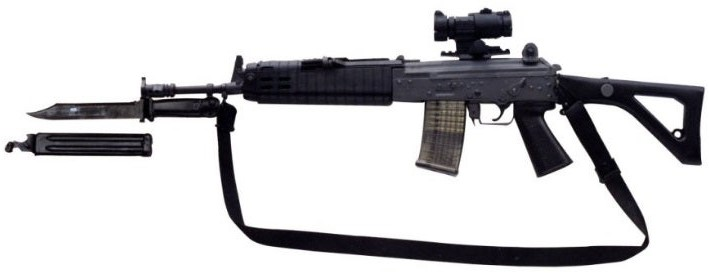
- Excalibur rifle with red dot scope/bayonet.
- Type: Assault rifle
- Place of origin: India

Service history
- In service: 2017

Production history
- Designed: 2004
- Manufacturer: Rifle Factory Ishapore
- Produced: 2012–present
- No. built: 20,000+

Specifications
- Mass: 3.81 kg (8.4 lb) (without magazine); 4.03 kg (8.9 lb) (with full magazine)
- Length: 895 mm (35.2 in)
- Barrel length: 400 mm (16 in)
- Cartridge: 5.56×45mm NATO
- Action: Gas-operated, rotating bolt
- Rate of fire: 650-700 rounds/min
- Muzzle velocity: 900 m/s (2,953 ft/s)
- Effective firing range: 450m
- Feed system: 20/30-round detachable box magazine
- Sights: In-built iron sights, Picatinny rails for mounting telescopic or night sights

The Excalibur is an assault rifle derived from the INSAS rifle, the standard rifle of the Indian Armed Forces and, to a lesser extent, the Indian Police Service. The Excalibur has many improvements over the INSAS rifle and was slated to replace it as the Indian Army's standard assault rifle; however, the Indian Army put the replacement out to tender in September 2016. Many police forces in India have procured the Excalibur in limited numbers.

It is manufactured by Ordnance Factory Board in Rifle Factory Ishapore.

== History ==
The Indian Army used the INSAS rifle from the late 1990s, and the rifle saw action during the Kargil War. The INSAS was said to be plagued with many reliability issues like cracking of the polymer magazines because of cold weather, oil being sprayed in the user's eyes and the rifle going into automatic mode when set on 3-round burst (the INSAS does not have an automatic mode).

From April 21 to 24, 2008, the Excalibur was shown at the Defence Services Asia convention.

In November 2011, the Indian Army sent a request for proposal (RFP) to 34 vendors for 65,678 multi-calibre assault rifles for about ₹2,500 crore (US$400 million). The tender also included a license to manufacture about 100,000 more rifles in India, with a total expenditure of the phasing out estimated at ₹5,500 crore (US$900 million). Similar tenders for a carbine and a light machine gun (LMG) were also issued. However, the Army sent a letter to the manufacturers on 15 June 2015, to notify them that the tender had been retracted. In July 2015, it was reported that the INSAS may be replaced by the Modified INSAS rifle (MIR), which is based on the Excalibur. The decision was taken by General Dalbir Singh, who wanted an indigenous rifle.

After cancelling the tender, the army decided to pursue the new Excalibur rifle developed by the ARDE as a replacement for the older INSAS rifles.

On 3 July 2016, the Indian media reported that the Indian Army had rejected the Excalibur for its standard issue assault rifle as it did not match the requirements standard of the army.

In September 2016 the Indian Army announced that it was launching a tender for 185,000 7.62×51mm-caliber assault rifles. The Indian Army in October 2016 announced that Excalibur rifles will be adopted as an interim assault rifle until a suitable replacement is found.

In June 2017, the Excalibur was announced to have failed tests due to concerns about quality control and ineffective firepower.

== Design ==
Design of the assault rifle first started in 2004.

=== Prototype ===
The prototype incorporates a direct gas-tapping angle to reduce the recoil. The rifle would have automatic and single shot modes. The three-round burst mode of the INSAS has been dropped. The rifle would have a folding butt and a standard Picatinny rail. By September 2015, it had passed the water and mud tests, which four of the foreign rifles in the tender competition had failed. It was also reported 200 rifles were being manufactured and that prototype would undergo formal trials in late 2015.

==== Tests ====
The MIR had two stoppages after firing 24,000 rounds, which was very close the army's specification of one stoppage. It was also reported that another prototype of Excalibur, AR-2, was being prepared which would fire 7.62×39mm rounds.

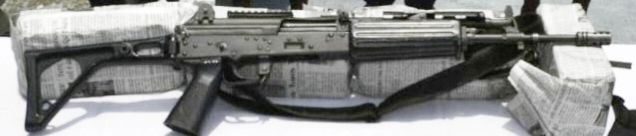
The Excalibur MK-II rifle (AR-2), 7.62×39mm variant.

=== Final ===
The final designs incorporated picatinny rails on the upper receiver with an improved design for the polycarbonate magazine.

== Operators ==
India

- Assam Police
- Chhattisgarh Armed Force, Chhattisgarh Police
- Karnataka Police
- Manipur Police
- West Bengal Police

=== Failed Contracts ===
- Indian Army

=== Non-State Actors ===
- People's Liberation Army of Manipur: Some Excaliburs used by PLA-M fighters.
