= ARDE Under Barrel Grenade Launcher =

Under Barrel Grenade Launcher, 40mm
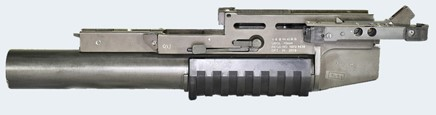
- ARDE UBGL.
- Type: Grenade launcher
- Place of origin: India

Service history
- In service: 2010–present
- Used by: Indian Army

Production history
- Designer: Armament Research and Development Establishment
- Designed: 2010
- Manufacturer: Ordnance Factory Tiruchirappalli
- No. built: 10,000 (September 2019)

Specifications
- Mass: 1.5 kg (unloaded)
- Length: 450mm
- Barrel length: 350mm
- Cartridge: 40x46mm
- Action: Single shot, Pump Action
- Rate of fire: 5 to 7 round/min
- Muzzle velocity: 250 ft/s (76 m/s)
- Effective firing range: 28-400m
- Maximum firing range: 400m
- Feed system: Breech Loading
- Sights: Various sights developed by ARDE for the launcher: Post type foresights; Ladder sight with 50m steps; Illuminated bubble sight for indirect firing; Tritium illuminated sight for night firing

The 40 mm Under Barrel Grenade Launcher, (Note: No official name is given to the grenade launcher as of March 2020.) is a single shot grenade launcher developed by ARDE and Ordnance Factory Tiruchirappalli for use with the INSAS and AK-47 rifles used by the Indian Army. Standalone versions of the grenade launcher exist.

As of September 2019, around 10,000 UBGLs were manufactured.

== History ==
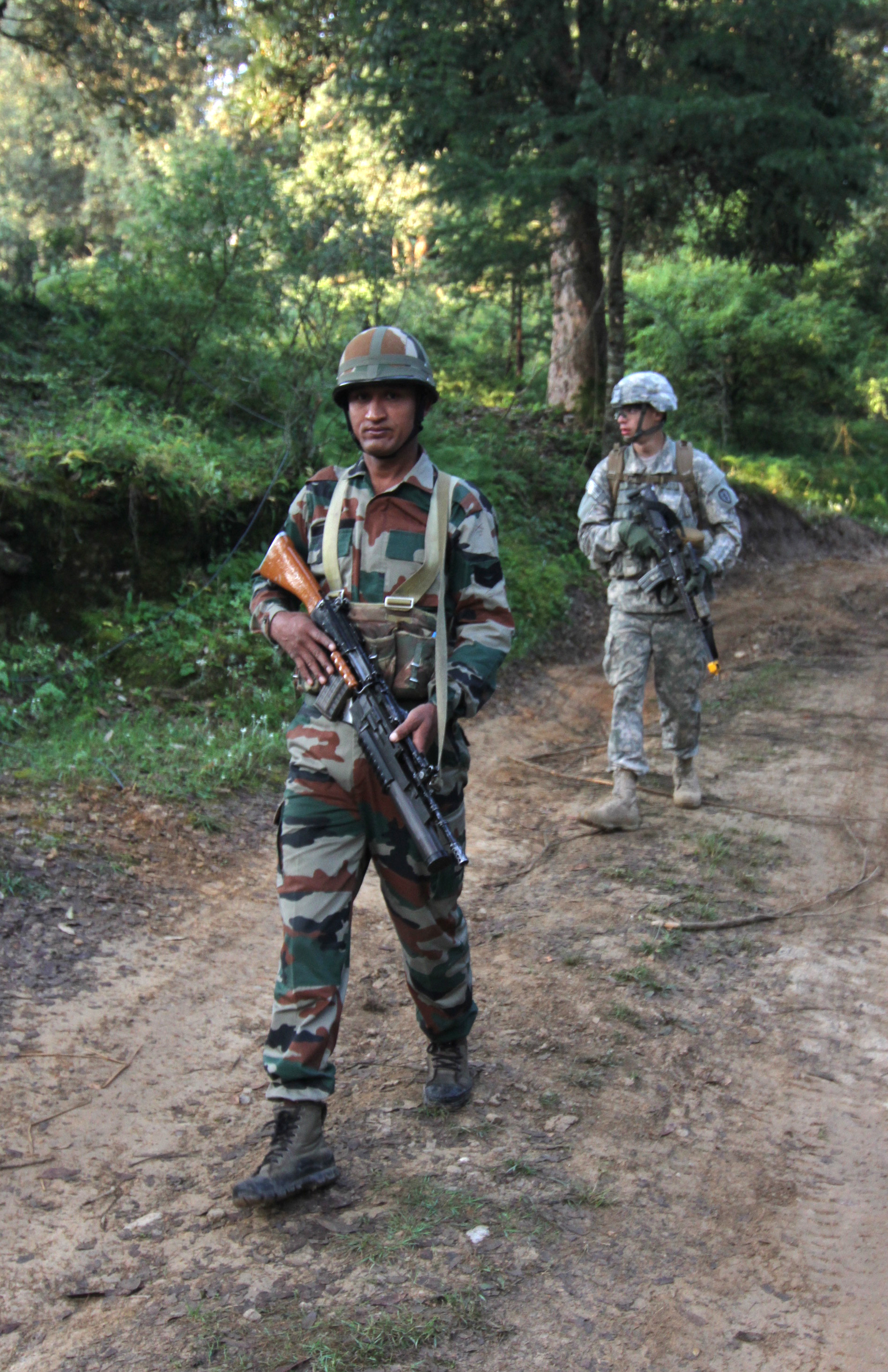
An Indian Army soldier with an INSAS AR outfitted with a UBGL.

The UBGL was in Indian military service since 2010. It was reported by the Indian Ministry of Defence in 2011 that paramilitary forces ordered around 100 UBGLs.

In 2020, production of 40mm rounds began in Ammunition Factory Khadki under Atmanirbhar Bharat. The first ammunition consignment was sent to the Border Security Force.

On August 2, 2021, OFT announced that the UBGL was made compatible with the Trichy assault rifle, which is being brought into service by the Central Reserve Police Force (CRPF), Central Armed Police Forces (CAPF) and various State Armed Police Forces.

== Design ==
The UBGL can be attached to the INSAS and various AK-47 rifles. It has a three-point attachment system to be able to mount the UBGL to the rifles with a built-in safety to prevent accidental discharge.

The trigger system is a button located on the left side of the barrel, allowing the soldier to fire both the rifle and grenade launcher without having to change his firing posture. Its maximum range is 400 metres.

The weapon uses a simple ladder sight mechanism, similar to the GP-25. It also has tritium illuminated sights for night firing. The ammunition fired by the UBGL is similar to the Milkor MGL used by the Indian Army, allowing for standardisation.

To install the UBGL, the handguard of an INSAS/AK-type rifle needs to be removed first before the device is installed.

=== Ammunition ===
The UBGL can be used to fire Practice, HEAP, HEDP and RP-type 40mm rounds.
