= INSAS rifle =

Indian family of infantry arms

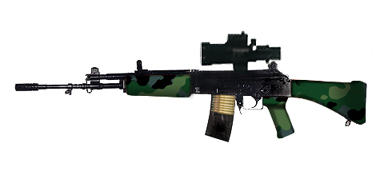
- INSAS rifle in the Indian army
- Type: Assault rifle; Light machine gun
- Place of origin: India

Service history
- In service: 1998–present
- Used by: See Operators
- Wars: Kargil War; Nepalese Civil War; Naxalite–Maoist insurgency; Insurgency in Northeast India; Operation All Clear; Myanmar Civil War; Insurgency in Jammu and Kashmir

Production history
- Designer: Armament Research and Development Establishment
- Designed: 1980s–1997
- Manufacturer: Ordnance Factories Board; Advanced Weapons and Equipment India Limited
- Produced: 1994–present
- No. built: 100,000 (Assault Rifles) and 6,000 (LMG) (2012); 700,000–900,000 (2019)
- Variants: See Variants

Specifications
- Mass: 4.018 kg (8.86 lb) (without magazine); 6.23 kg (13.7 lb) (LMG); 1,050 mm (41 in) (LMG); 535 mm (21.1 in) (LMG)
- Cartridge: 5.56×45mm NATO
- Action: Gas-operated, Rotating bolt
- Rate of fire: singles, 3 round burst; 600–650 rounds/min (LMG)
- Muzzle velocity: 915 m/s (3,002 ft/s)
- Effective firing range: 400m (INSAS Rifle); 600 m: Point targets (INSAS LMG); 700 m: Area target (INSAS LMG)
- Feed system: 20- or 30-round detachable box magazine
- Sights: In-built iron sights, mount point for telescopic or night sight

The INSAS, or Indian Small Arms System, is a family of infantry arms consisting of an assault rifle and a light machine gun (LMG). These weapons were developed in India by the Armament Research and Development Establishment and manufactured by the Ordnance Factories Board at its various factories. It was the standard infantry weapon of the Indian Armed Forces for almost three decades.

== History ==
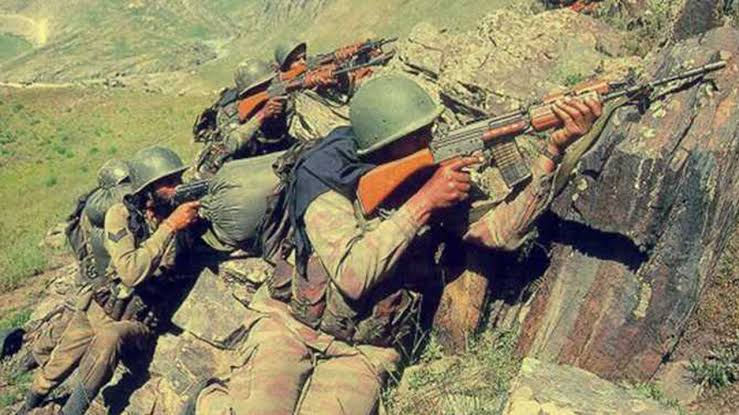
Indian soldiers in combat with INSAS rifle during the Kargil War.

The first combat use of the rifle was during the Kargil War in 1999. The development of the INSAS began in the mid-1980s, when the Indian Army released a general staff qualitative requirement for a new assault rifle to replace locally produced licensed copies of the L1A1 self-loading rifles, which the Army was using since 1961. The Indian army actively used the INSAS rifles during the Kargil war of 1999. These rifles helped the soldiers to aim precisely and recapture the peaks which were occupied by Pakistani soldiers, along with the guidance and help of the MIG 21 fighter jets, who played a crucial role in recapturing the peaks.

After studying several designs, the Armament Research and Development Establishment (ARDE) in Pune undertook the task of designing and developing India's first assault rifle. The development and user trials of the new rifle, INSAS, were completed by 1989 and entered into service in 1990. Originally, three variants were planned in the INSAS system: a rifle, a carbine, and a squad automatic weapon (SAW) or Light machine gun (LMG). In 1997, the rifle and the LMG went into mass production. In 1998, the first INSAS rifles were displayed at the Republic Day parade. The introduction of the rifle was delayed due to the lack of adequate 5.56×45mm ammunition, large quantities of which were bought from Israel Military Industries.

The INSAS series rifles are the third generation of standard-issue rifle of the infantry of the Indian Army, following the Lee–Enfield bolt action rifles (in service 1947–mid-1960s) (Note: Retired immediately after Sino-Indian War.) and L1A1 Self-Loading Rifles (in service 1961–1998). (Note: Adopted and license manufactured by Ordnance Factory Board post Sino-Indo War and retired with the induction of AK-47 derivatives and INSAS.) While the L1A1 was outdated by the 1980s but the INSAS was still under development, multiple derivatives of AK-47 were adopted, starting with around 12,000 Soviet-origin AK-47 (produced by the Izhmash) captured from insurgents, followed by purchasing the Czech-origin Vz. 58, Bulgarian-origin AR-M1 from Arsenal AD.

The INSAS rifle saw limited use in the Indian Army's counter-insurgency operations in Jammu and Kashmir, but was extensively used by Central Armed Police Forces in combating Maoist insurgency.

=== Replacement ===
The INSAS assault rifles are being replaced in the Army with the AK-203 assault rifles and the SIG 716i battle rifles. The LMG variant is being replaced with the IWI Negev. However, these rifles will remain in service with the police and other paramilitary forces and are being used as a replacement for the decades old bolt action Ishapore 2A1 rifles.

== Design and performance ==
The INSAS is primarily based on the AKM but incorporates features from other rifles. It has a chrome-plated bore. The barrel has a six-groove rifling. The basic gas operated long stroke piston and the rotating bolt are similar to the AKM/AK-47.

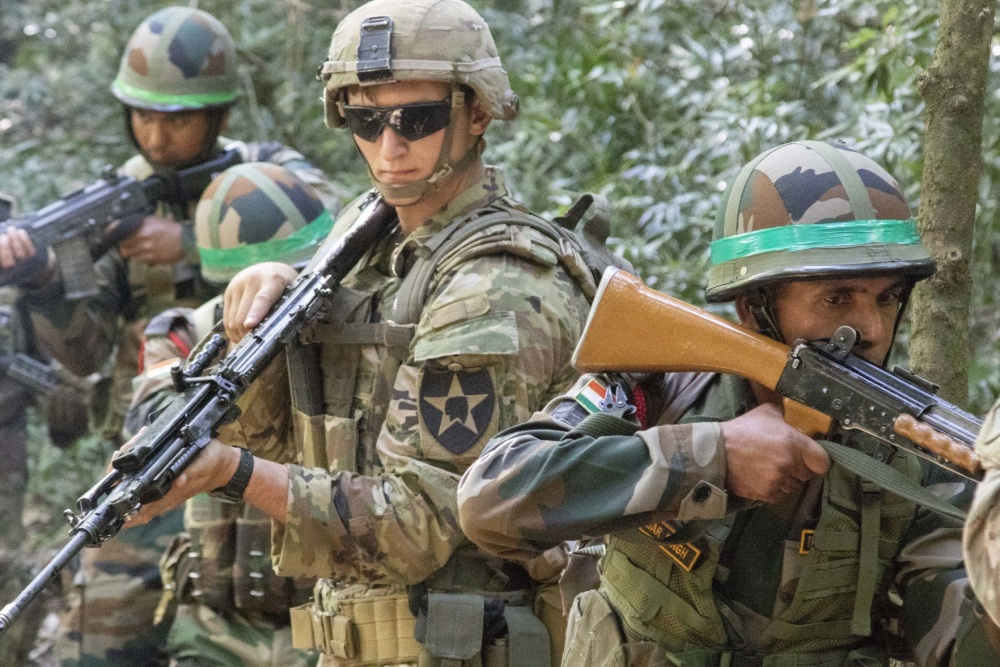
US Army soldier and Indian soldiers with the INSAS. The two types of INSAS assault rifle include the 1B1 (rear) and the original (front).

It has a manual gas regulator, similar to that of FN FAL, and a gas cutoff for launching grenades. The charging handle is on the left instead of on the bolt carrier, similar in operation to the HK33. The fire selector is placed on the left side of the receiver above the pistol grip; it can be set to semi–auto, three-round burst, and full auto. To set it to safe, the selector has to be rotated all the way up, which will block the sear and prevent the rifle from firing. It has three modes of fire – semi-automatic, three-round burst and full automatic modes. The cyclic rate averages at 650 rpm. The rear sight lies on one end of the breech cover and is calibrated to 400 meters.

The furniture is either made of wood or polymer. The polymer butt and forend assemblies differ from the AKM and are more similar to those of IMI Galil. Some variants have a folding butt. A bayonet can also be attached to it. The guns take 20 or 30-round magazines; they are made like the Steyr AUG and are made out of polymer. The 30-round magazine is made for the LMG version but can also be used in the rifle. The flash suppressor also accepts NATO-specification rifle grenades. Factory-made brass catchers can be installed on the INSAS to collect used brass, although there are reports of improvised brass catchers made from used bottles and wire mesh.

In 2023, it was reported that Star Aerospace has offered parts for modernizing INSAS rifles, which are approved by the Ministry of Home Affairs. Among the upgrades included by SA consist of picatinny rails for sights and attachments, folding stock and rubber fore and pistol grips.

The INSAS assault rifle was battle-tested in the 1999 Kargil War. The three-month-long war was fought in the high altitudes of the Himalayas, where the temperature would go as low as –20 degrees Celsius. During the conflict, the rifle encountered some problems, such as occasional, often serious stoppages, cracking of the polymer magazine due to the cold weather, and some other reliability issues, such as firing in full auto when set for 3-shot burst. Similar complaints were also received from the Nepalese Army. In the Kargil war, the INSAS proved neither reliable nor satisfactory for the Army. The Indian Army, which was used to the 7.62×51mm NATO round for almost three decades, was dissatisfied with the stopping power of 5.56×45mm NATO rounds.

== Variants ==
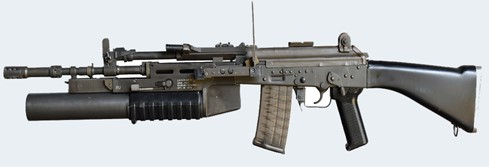
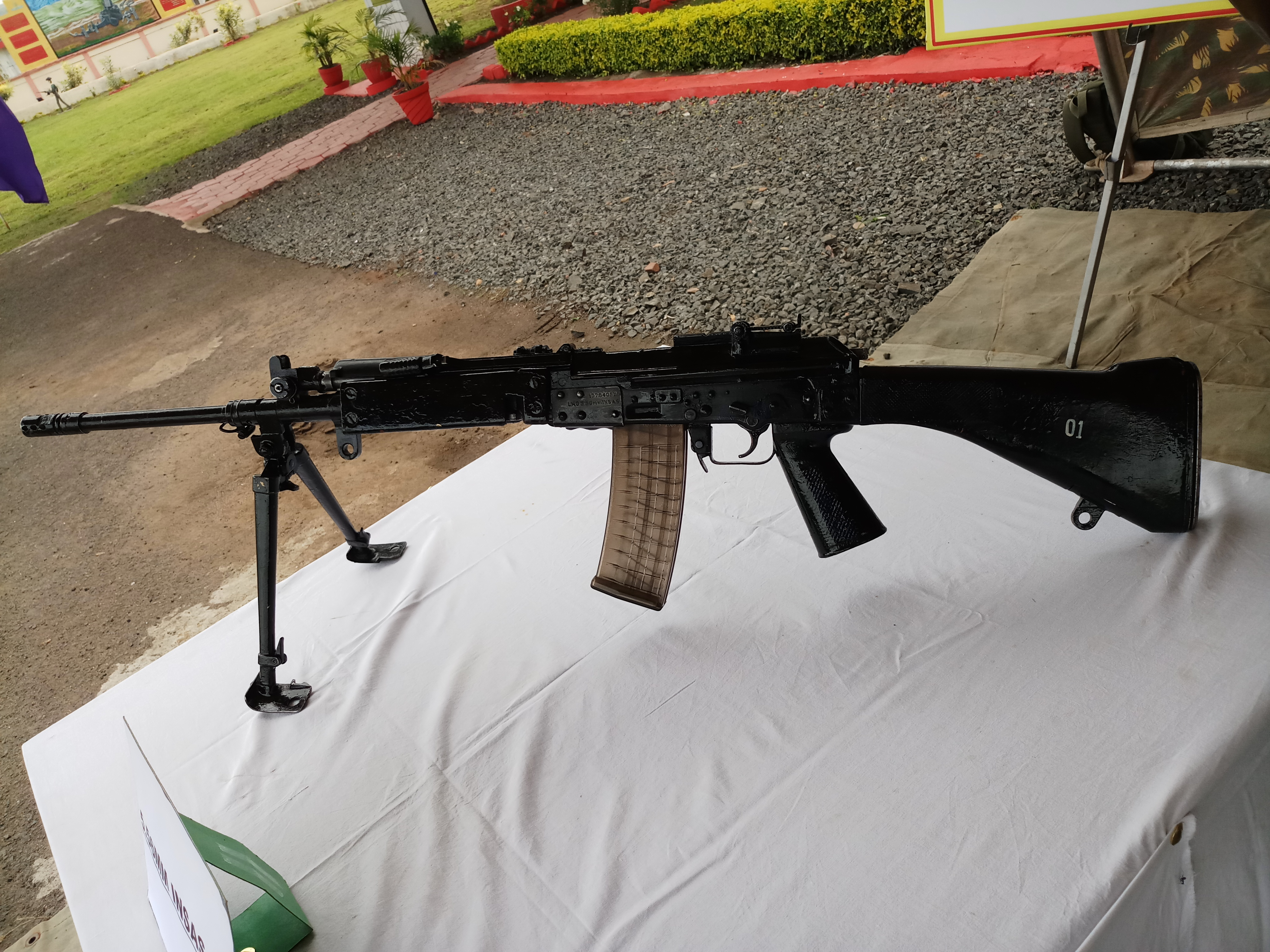
INSAS AR (with UBGL) (top) and LMG (bottom).

=== Assault rifle ===
The standard issue rifle is produced in a select fire (semi-automatic & 3-round burst) version. A telescopic sight and a passive night sight are available for the weapon system. It has a bayonet mount and furniture featuring mounting capabilities for the ARDE Under Barrel Grenade Launcher. The rifle is equipped with an adjustable gas block regulator which, when flipped up, acts as an iron sight for a 40mm grenade launcher. The flash suppressor has a blank-firing adaptor. Additional furniture for the rifle is made, offering a folding stock.The AR has four subvariants:

- INSAS 1A
- INSAS 1A1
- INSAS 1B
- INSAS 1B1: Further improved variant introduced in 2001 based on Indian Army feedback.

=== Light Machine Gun ===
The Light Machine Gun (LMG) differs from the standard rifle in possessing a longer range of 700 m, as compared to a 400 m range for its assault rifle counterparts. It has a longer and heavier barrel with revised rifling and a bipod. The LMG version uses 30-round magazines and can also accept the 20-round INSAS AR magazine. This platform features select fire between semi-automatic and fully automatic. Furniture is also made for the LMG, allowing for a folding stock. The LMG will be replaced with the Negev NG-7.

=== Others ===
- Excalibur rifle
- Amogh carbine
- DRDO Close Quarter Battle carbine
- Kalantak: The Kalantak micro-assault rifle, with a range of 300 m, is for close combat and personnel defence weapon roles.
- Prototype Bullpup: Lieutenant Colonel Prasad Bansod, of Army School Mhow reverse-engineered an INSAS rifle to produce a bullpup carbine variant. Lt. Col. Bansod caught the attention of high-ranking Indian Army officers when he made the rifle in 2019. He reportedly did this in his spare time. The rifle was only made as a prototype example.

== Operators ==
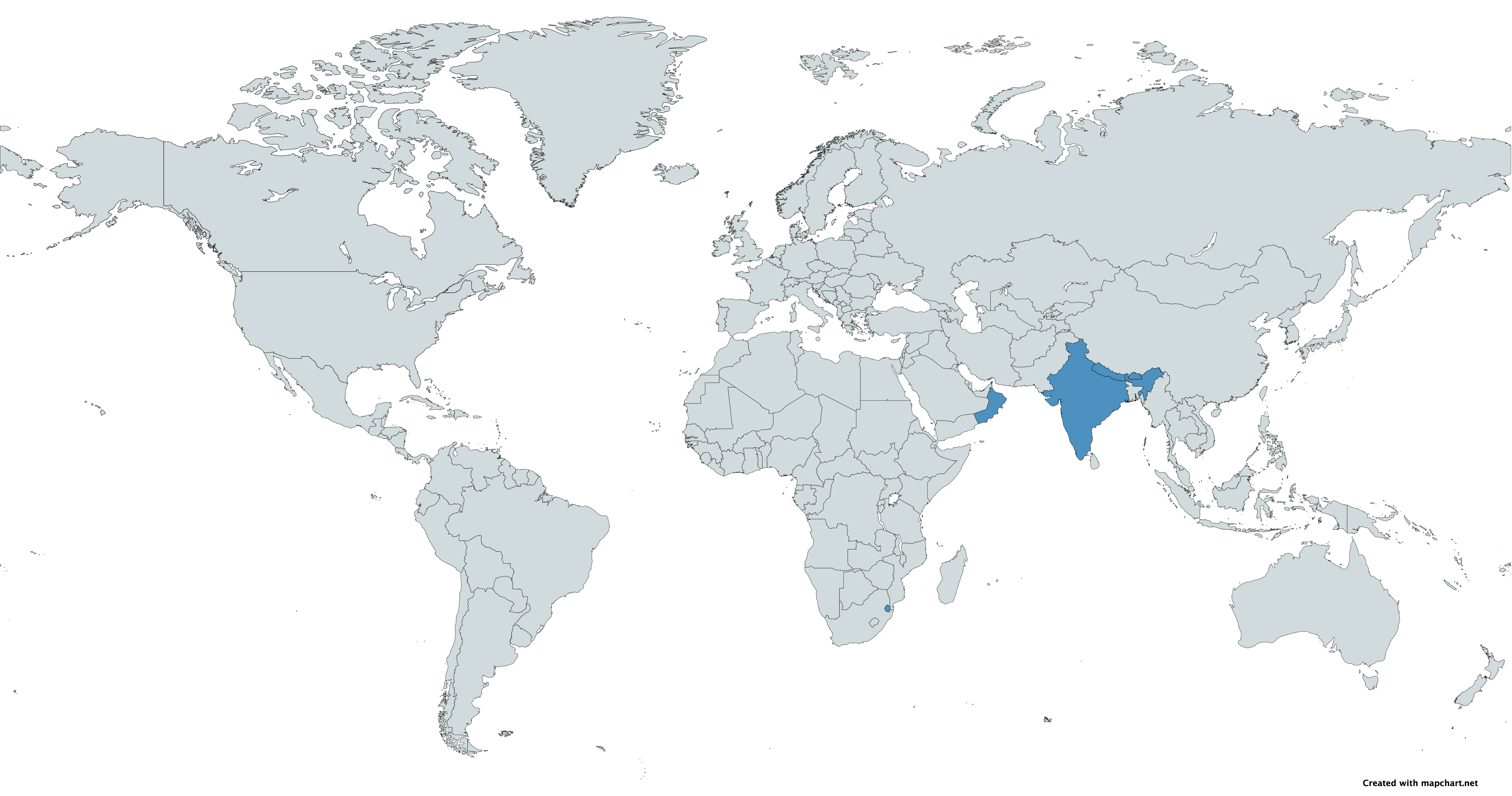
Map with INSAS users in blue

=== State forces ===
- India: Assault rifles and LMG variants in use.
  - INSAS rifles are being phased out and will be replaced by AK-203 'Sher' and SIG-716i rifles as per the latest contract. INSAS LMGs using 5.56×45mm will be replaced by IWI Negev NG5, and the ones using 7.62×51mm will be replaced by the IWI Negev NG7 as per latest contract for 16,479 NG7s.
  - Border Security Force
  - Central Armed Police Forces
  - Central Industrial Security Force
  - State Police Services
- Bhutan: Used by the Royal Bhutan Army.
- Eswatini
- Kenya: In April 2026, the Indian Navy handed over 100 INSAS rifles along with 50,000 rounds of ammunition to the Kenyan Navy as part of increasing Indian-Kenyan defence and maritime cooperation.
- Nepal: The Nepalese Army had received about 26,000 rifles since 2001, supplied at a 70% subsidy by India. As of July 20, 2020, the Nepali Army transferred 600 INSAS rifles to the Nepali Armed Police Force.
- Oman: In 2010, the Royal Army of Oman started using the INSAS rifles sent to them as per a defence agreement signed in 2003 between India and Oman.

=== Non-state actors ===
- Communist Party of India (Maoist): INSAS rifles looted from dead Indian police officers or stolen from police stations. Others clandestinely acquired from Rifle Factory Ishapore by corrupt officials.
- Hizbul Mujahideen: Used captured INSAS rifles.
- People's Revolutionary Party of Kangleipak: Uses looted INSAS rifles.
- People's Defence Force: 1B1 variant.
- Taliban
