= AR-M1 =

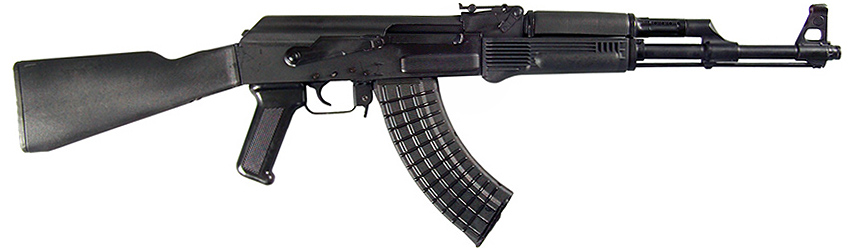
- An Arsenal AR in 7.62x39mm
- Type: Assault Rifle
- Place of origin: Bulgaria

Service history
- In service: 2000–present
- Used by: See Users
- Wars: Insurgency in Jammu and Kashmir; 2001 insurgency in Macedonia; War in Afghanistan (2001–2021); Iraq War; Russo-Georgian war Syrian Civil War; Second Libyan Civil War; Yemeni Civil War (2014-present)

Production history
- Manufacturer: Arsenal AD
- Produced: 1998 - present
- Variants: See Variants

Specifications
- Mass: (without magazine) 3.62 kg (7.98 lb)
- Length: 930 mm (36.6 in)
- Cartridge: 5.56×45mm NATO and 7.62×39mm
- Action: Gas-operated reloading
- Rate of fire: 600–700 rounds/min
- Muzzle velocity: 910 m/s (2,986 ft/s)
- Effective firing range: 600m
- Maximum firing range: 1,350 m
- Feed system: 30-round detachable box magazine
- Sights: 370 mm (14.6 in) sight radius

The AR-M1 is a Bulgarian assault rifle designed primarily for export. It is a modernized derivative of the AK-47 (specifically the Type 3 variant).

There are two versions of the AR-M1. One chambered in 5.56×45mm NATO, and the other in the Soviet 7.62×39mm cartridge.

== History ==
During the late 1950s, the Bulgarian People's Army was equipped with AK-47s imported from the Soviet Union. However, by the early 1960s, the Bulgarian government became interested in producing the AK assault rifle domestically. Assembly of AKs, initially from imported Soviet parts, began at the Arsenal AD state arsenal in Kazanlak. By the mid 1960s, the Kazanlak facility was equipped to begin licensed production of the weapon type and its associated parts. Kalashnikov rifles assembled and later manufactured in Kazanlak received the designation AKK. A derivative with a folding stock was also produced under license as the AKKS.

After the dissolution of the People's Republic of Bulgaria in the early 1990s, the Kazanlak factory became a joint-stock company known as Arsenal AD. Arsenal offered several modernized variants of the AKK for export, which were rebranded as the AR series. The AR pattern rifles are AKKs with different furniture and a few unique features, such as polymer stocks and handguards, as well as several external parts copied directly from the AK-74 including new flash hiders, sights, gas blocks, bayonet mountings and bayonets. Unlike the stamped receiver on the AKM, AR-M1 receivers are milled and are virtually indistinguishable from those of the early pattern Soviet AKs.

A derivative of the AKKS is also offered for export as the ARF.

== Variants ==
The following are/were manufacted by Arsenal AD.

- AR-M1 / AR-M1F (Note: The -F model features a folding stock.) - improved AKK copy with a flash suppressor, black polymer stock set, luminous spots on the iron sights and a rail for mounting optics. Chambered in 5.56×45mm NATO and 7.62×39mm.
- AR-M2 / AR-M2F - improved AK-74 copy like the AR-M1/AR-M1F, but with a shortened barrel, AKS-74U front sight base and muzzle booster/flash suppressor hybrid.
- AR-M4SF - extremely short development of the AR-M1 with red dot sight, provision to mount a night vision or laser sight. Chambered in 5.56×45mm NATO and 7.62×39mm.
- AR-M7F - like the AR-M1, but with an AK-101-style folding stock.
- AR-M9 / AR-M9F - improved AK-74 copy like the AR-M1/AR-M1F, features a thumb-operable fire selector and a different style polymer stock set.
- AR / AR-F - improved AK-47 copies with black polymer lining and optional luminous sights.
- Trichy assault rifle - Indian clone of the AR-M1 series.

== Users ==
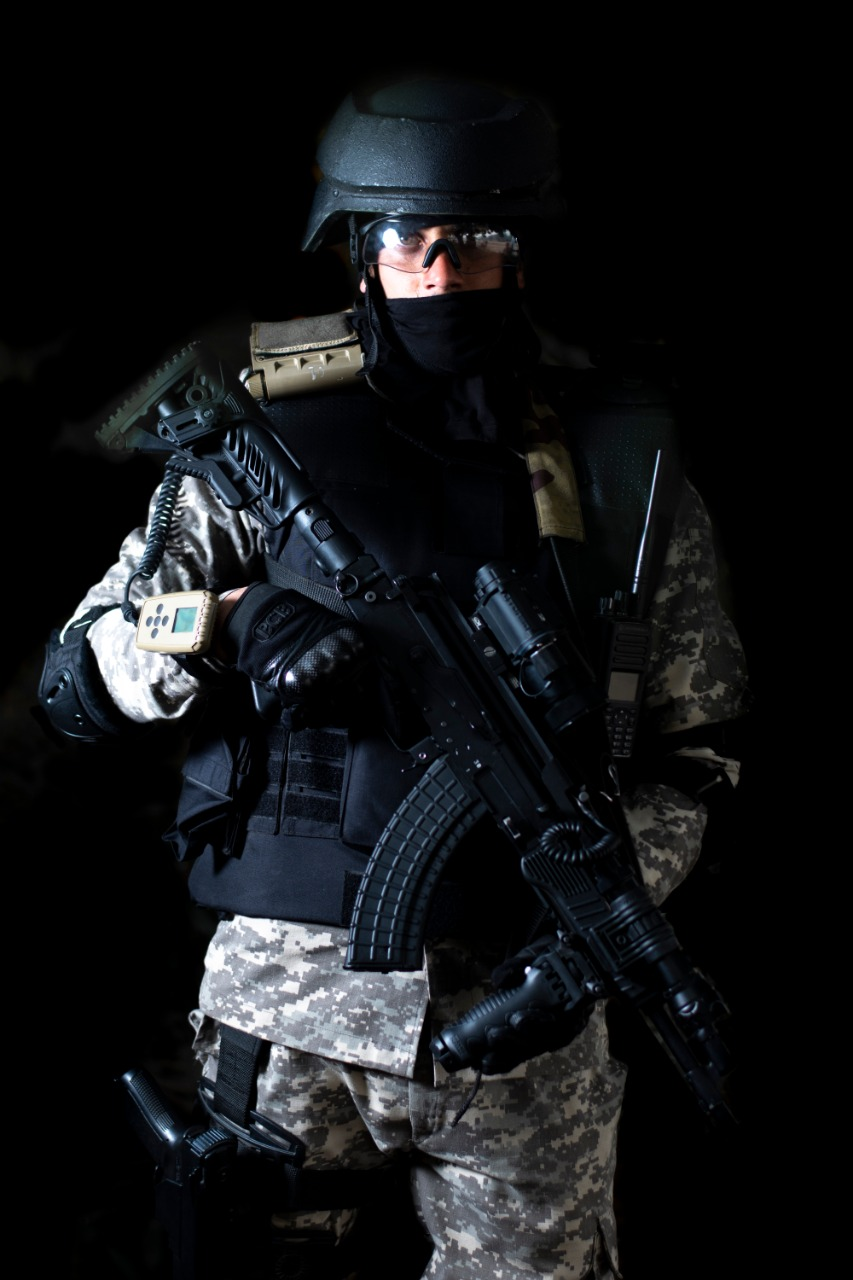
An Indian CRPF QRT operator with an AR-M1F41 modified with Israeli FAB Defense accessories.

- Azerbaijan
- Bulgaria: AR-M14SF used by the Military Police.
- Burundi
- Cameroon: AR-M4SF used by the Police.
- Egypt
- Georgia: 3500 5.45mm AR-M1 rifles imported
- Honduras: 5.56mm AR-M4SF used by the Police.
- India: Railway Protection Force, Central Armed Police Forces.
- Indonesia: AR-M1F used by Tontaipur.
- Iraq: 751 5.56mm AR-M1F rifles, also AR-M1s
- Ivory Coast
- Libya: 11th Lightning Battalion uses AR-M9s.
- Niger: Special forces using AR-M52T rifles.
- Philippines: AR-M52F used by First Special Forces Regiment, Philippine Army.
- Serbia: Arsenal AR.
- Somalia: Used by DANAB Brigade.
- Sudan: AR-M9s
- Uganda: AR-9F used by Ugandan Army.
- United Arab Emirates: AR-M9s
- United Kingdom: AR-M9Fs in 5.56mm NATO, bought as part of Operation Interflex.
- United States: AR-M1s in 5.56mm NATO, used by the 1st Battalion, 4th Infantry Regiment in their role as the opposing force at the Joint Multinational Readiness Center.
- Yemen: AR-M9s
