= Ochterlony =

Ochterlony or Ouchterlony may refer to:

- Ouchterlony Valley, or O' Valley, a town in Gudalur Taluk, Nilgiris district, Tamil Nadu, India

== People with the surname ==
=== Ochterlony ===
- David Ochterlony (1758–1825), Massachusetts-born general of the East India Company in British India
- David Ochterlony Dyce Sombre (1808–1851), an Anglo-Indian held to be the first person of Asian descent to be elected to the British Parliament
- John Ochterlony (1667–1742), Anglican clergyman in the Scottish Episcopal Church and Bishop of Brechin
- Matthew Ochterlony (1880–1946), Scottish baronet and architect

=== Ouchterlony ===
- Örjan Ouchterlony (1914–2004), Swedish bacteriologist and immunologist

== See also ==
- Ochterlony baronets and the Ochterlony Baronetcy, two titles in the Baronetage of the United Kingdom
- Ochterlony Monument or Shaheed Minar, a monument in Kolkata. India
- Ouchterlony double immunodiffusion, an immunological technique named after Örjan Ouchterlony
