= David Ochterlony =

First British Resident of Delhi (1758–1825)

Major-General Sir David Ochterlony GCB Bt
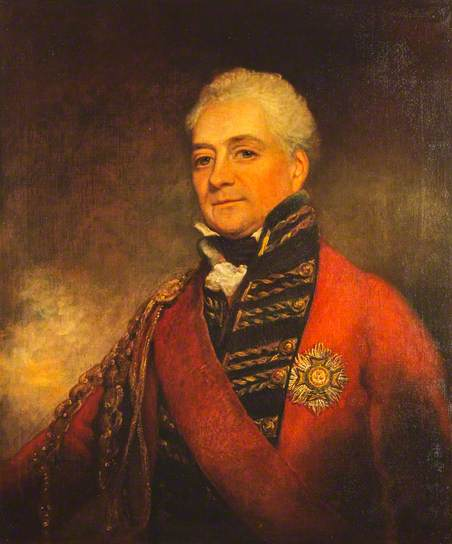
- Portrait by Arthur William Devis, c. 1816
- Born: 12 February 1758; Boston, Province of Massachusetts Bay, British America
- Died: 14 July 1825 (aged 67); Meerut, Bengal Presidency, Company's India
- Burial place: St. John's Church, Meerut
- Military career
- Allegiance: East India Company
- Branch: Bengal Army
- Service years: 1778–1825
- Rank: Major-General
- Commands: 2nd Battalion 12th Bengal Native Infantry; Resident at Delhi; Allahabad Garrison; Ludhiana Garrison; Third Field Division; Field Army, Nepal; Division protecting Delhi; Resident at Rajputana; Commissioner-General, Rajput states Resident at Delhi; Resident at Malwa and Rajputana
- Conflicts: Second Anglo-Mysore War; Siege of Cuddalore (WIA) (POW); Second Anglo-Maratha War; Siege of Aligarh; Battle of Delhi; Siege of Delhi; Anglo-Nepalese War; Second Battle of Malaun and Jaithak; Battle of Makmanpur; Third Anglo-Maratha War

Major-General Sir David Ochterlony, 1st Baronet, GCB (12 February 1758 – 14 July 1825) was a Bengal Army officer who served as the British resident to the Mughal court at Delhi. Born in Boston, Massachusetts, he spent most of his life on the Indian subcontinent in the service of the East India Company, seeing action in numerous conflicts.

== Biography ==
=== Background ===
David Ochterlony was born in Boston, Massachusetts, the eldest son of Captain David Ochterlony (also Ochterloney) and his wife, Katherine Tyler. His father was born into an ancient family in Forfarshire, Scotland, and his mother was born in Boston to settlers of English and Welsh descent. His mother was the niece of Sir William Pepperrell. He attended the Boston Latin School and Dummer Charity School (now known as The Governor's Academy) in nearby Byfield, Massachusetts.

He had two younger brothers, Gilbert and Alexander, and a sister, Catherine. Captain Ochterlony died in the Saint Vincent, West Indies, in 1765, after which his widow moved to England and his mother remarried to Sir Isaac Heard, Garter King-of-Arms.

=== Career in India ===
In 1777, at age 18, Ochterlony went as a cadet to India. In February 1778 he was commissioned into the Bengal Native Infantry as an ensign and that same September was advanced to lieutenant.

In June 1782 while serving in the Second Anglo-Mysore War he was wounded and taken prisoner by the forces of Haidar Ali. He remained in captivity for the duration of the war and was only released when peace resumed in 1784. Thereafter, he returned to Calcutta, and in recognition of his eminent service during the war was conferred with the appointment of Judge Advocate-General for one of the divisions in the army. In 1796, he was promoted to captain and in 1800 to major.

In early 1803, he was appointed lieutenant colonel and accompanied Lord Lake throughout the Second Anglo-Maratha War. He was present at the battles of Koil, Aligarh and Delhi. Following the battle of Delhi he was appointed Resident at Delhi. In 1804, he defended the city with a very inadequate force against an attack by Yashwantrao Holkar which earned him the highest approbation from the Commander-in-Chief. He was thereafter given the command at Allahabad and then commanded a force on the banks of the Sutlej to check the expansion of the Sikhs. He was promoted to Major-general in 1814.

On the outbreak of the Anglo-Nepalese War in 1814 he was given the command of one of four converging columns. His was regarded as the only truly successful column throughout the war. He was subsequently promoted to the command of the main force in its advance on Kathmandu and outmaneuvered the Gurkhas by a flank march at the Kourea Ghat Pass, brought the war to a successful conclusion and obtained the signature of the Treaty of Sugauli, which dictated the subsequent relations of the British with Nepal.

In return for his services during the war, he became a Knight Commander of the Bath, the first time the honour had been conferred on an officer of the British military in India, and was granted a baronetcy in November 1815. The following month he was given a pension of £1,000 per annum.

In December 1816, he was made a Knight Grand Cross of the Order of the Bath. In 1818, he was appointed Resident in Rajpootana, with which the Residency at Delhi was subsequently combined. In the Pindari War between 1818 and 1819 he commanded the Rajputana column and made a separate agreement with Amir Khan. He detached him from the Pindaris, and then, interposing his force between the two main divisions of the enemy, brought the war to an end without an engagement. He was afterwards made Resident and Political Agent of Malwa, thus having the entire superintendency of the affairs of central India. Today the CRPF Academy mess in Neemuch, MP is housed in what was once the British residency, currently known as Ochterlony House. It was built by Ochterlony in 1822 at a cost of Rs. 50,000 (a huge amount in those days), sanctioned by the East India Company. Ochterlony lived there for three years before returning to Delhi.

During this period he encountered and engaged in an ongoing personal feud with James Tod, which was based most likely on the power politics within the hierarchy of the East India Company.

=== Death ===
When Durjan Sal revolted in 1825 against Balwant Singh, the infant Raja of the Princely state of Bharatpur, Ochterlony acting on his own accord supported the young Raja by proclamation and ordered out a force to support him. However, the Governor-General of India, Lord Amherst, repudiated these proceedings and ordered the army to return. Ochterlony, who was bitterly chagrined by this rebuff, resigned his office and retired to Delhi. He was to be replaced by his good friend Sir Charles Metcalfe. The feeling that the confidence that his length of service merited had not been given him by the governor-general is said to have accelerated his death, and he died at Meerut in July 1825. He is interred in St. John's Church in Meerut. The Ochterlony column at Calcutta commemorated his name, though it has since been rededicated.

== Private life ==
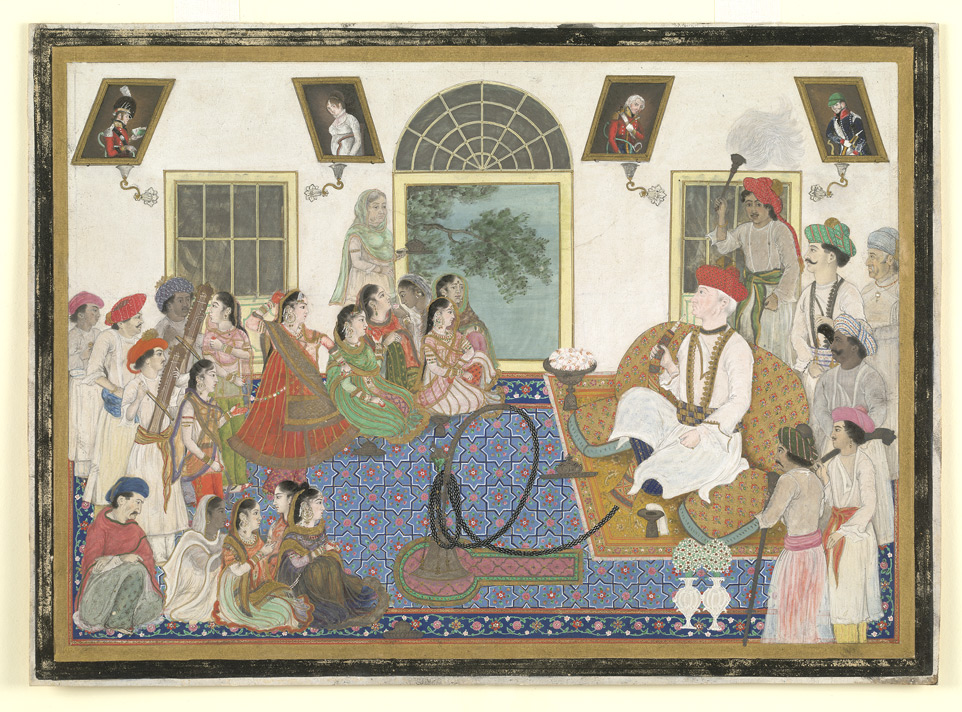
Watercolor by an anonymous Delhi artist of Sir David Ochterlony in Indian dress smoking a hookah ca. 1820s

As the official British Resident at Delhi, David Ochterlony adopted and thoroughly embraced the Indo-Persian culture of the Mughals. He was reputed to have thirteen Indian concubines (as seen by the British) or wives (as seen by others). Every evening, he used to take all thirteen of his wives on a promenade around the walls of the Red Fort, each on the back of her own elephant.

== Mubarak Begum ==
The most prominent among Ochterlony's women was "Bibi (or Bebee) Mubarak-ul-Nissa Begum". Reportedly his favorite wife, she was the mother of his two youngest children, both daughters. She was known as "Generallee Begum". As such, she took clear precedence over the rest of the household. She was considered to be a devout Muslim, having once applied for leave to make the hajj to Mecca.

Although much younger than Ochterlony, Mubarak was seen as the dominant personality in the relationship. This led one observer to remark that "making Sir David the Commissioner of Delhi was the same as making Generallee Begum". Another observer remarked that "Ochterlony's mistress is the mistress now of everyone within the walls. As a result of her influence, Ochterlony considered raising his children as Muslims, and when his two daughters by Mubarak Begum had grown up, he adopted a child from the family of the Nawabs of Loharu, one of the leading Muslim families of Delhi. Raised by Mubarak, the girl went on to marry her cousin, a nephew of the famous Urdu poet Mirza Ghalib.

Mubarak even seems to have set herself up as a power in her own right, and even formed her own independent foreign policy. At one point, it was reported that "Mubarak Begum, alias Generalee Begum, fills the [Delhi] papers with accounts of the Nizars and Khiluts [gifts and dresses of honor] given and taken by her in her transactions with the Vacquils [ambassadors of the different Indian powers] - an extraordinary liberty, if true."

However, in spite of all her power and high status, Mubarak Begum was widely unpopular among the British and the Mughals alike. She offended the British by calling herself "Lady Ochterlony" and on the other hand, also offended the Mughals by awarding herself the title "Qudsia Begum", a title previously reserved for the Emperor's mother. After Ochterlony's death, she inherited Mubarak Bagh, an Anglo-Mughal garden tomb Ochterlony had built in the north of Old Delhi, but her intense unpopularity combined with her background as a dancing girl ensured that no Mughal gentleman would use her structure. To this date, the tomb is still referred to by the local inhabitants of the old city as the "Randi ki Masjid" ("Prostitute's Mosque").

== Descendants ==
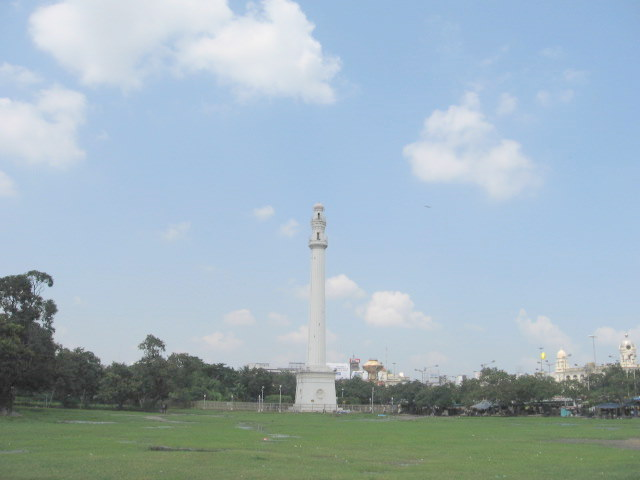
Shaheed Minar, Kolkata, built as a memorial to Sir David Ochterlony.

Ochterlony had at least six natural (illegitimate) children, by two or more of his concubines:

1. Roderick Peregrine Ochterlony, of Delhi (1785-d by 1823), his only son; he married 1808 Sarah Nelly, the daughter of Lt. Col. John Nelly of the Bengal Engineers, at Allahabad, India. Roderick and Sarah Ochterlony had three children. A daughter, Charlotte Ochterlony, died in 1835 (death mentioned in The Gentleman's Magazine).
  1. Sir Charles Metcalfe Ochterlony, 2nd Baronet (1817–1891), who succeeded his grandfather by special remainder in 1825. He married in 1844 a Miss Sarah Tribe of Liverpool, and had as descendants three sons and two daughters. The creation of this baronetcy became extinct on the death of the fifth Baronet in 1964.
  2. Charlotte Ochterlony (d. 1835)
2. [by Mubarak Begum] a daughter
3. [by Mubarak Begum] a daughter

Baronetage of the United Kingdom
New title	Baronet (of Pitforthy); 1816–1825	Extinct
New title	Baronet (of Ochterlony); 1823–1825	Succeeded by Charles Ochterlony
Preceded by Tarleton baronets	Ochterlony baronets of Pitforthy; 7 March 1816	Succeeded by Brownrigg baronets
Preceded by Baillie baronets	Ochterlony baronets of Ochterlony; 8 December 1823	Succeeded by Lowther baronets
