= Amit Kumar Mehlan =

Assistant Commandant Amit Kumar Mehlan is a serving Central Reserve Police Force officer of the 2010 batch of the Union Public Service Commission of India. President Droupadi Murmu presented Shaurya Chakra to Amit Kumar for displaying extreme valour and leadership skills in evacuating his injured teammates and eliminating terrorists during an operation in Srinagar, Jammu and Kashmir.

== Career ==
Amit, a resident of Meerut, completed his schooling at the Army School Meerut Cantonment. After schooling, he completed his graduation and post-graduation in Physics from Meerut College. Singh joined the Central Reserve Police Force as an assistant commandant and trained at the CRPF Academy in Gurgaon. He has served in Central Reserve Police Force Valley Quick Action Team.
