= Patala, Uttar Pradesh =

Patala Patla
- Town
- Location in Uttar Pradesh, India Patala (India)
- Coordinates: 28.886523°N 77.500412°E
- Country: India
- State: Uttar Pradesh
- District: Ghaziabad

Population (2001)
  - Total: 9,730

Languages
  - Official: Hindi
- Time zone: UTC+5:30 (IST)
- Vehicle registration: UP

Patala is a town and a nagar panchayat in Ghaziabad district in the Indian state of Uttar Pradesh.

Patala is mostly inhabited by Jats, who commonly use the surname Naresh.

== Demographics ==
As of the 2001 Census of India, Patala had a population of 9,730. Males constitute 54% of the population and females 46%. Patala has an average literacy rate of 61%, which is higher than the national average of 59.5%. Male literacy is 70%, and female literacy is 51%. In Patala, 14% of the population is under 6 years of age.
