= Rahul Mathur =

Deputy Commandant Rahul Mathur is a serving CRPF officer of 2008 Batch UPSC who was awarded with Kirti Chakra by the President of India Ram Nath Kovind.

== Career ==
Mathur joined the CRPF as Assistant Commandant and trained at CRPF Academy in Gurgaon. He has also served in CRPF Valley QAT. In 2020, he was wounded during an anti-terror operation in Batmaloo in Srinagar.
