= Internal Security Academy =

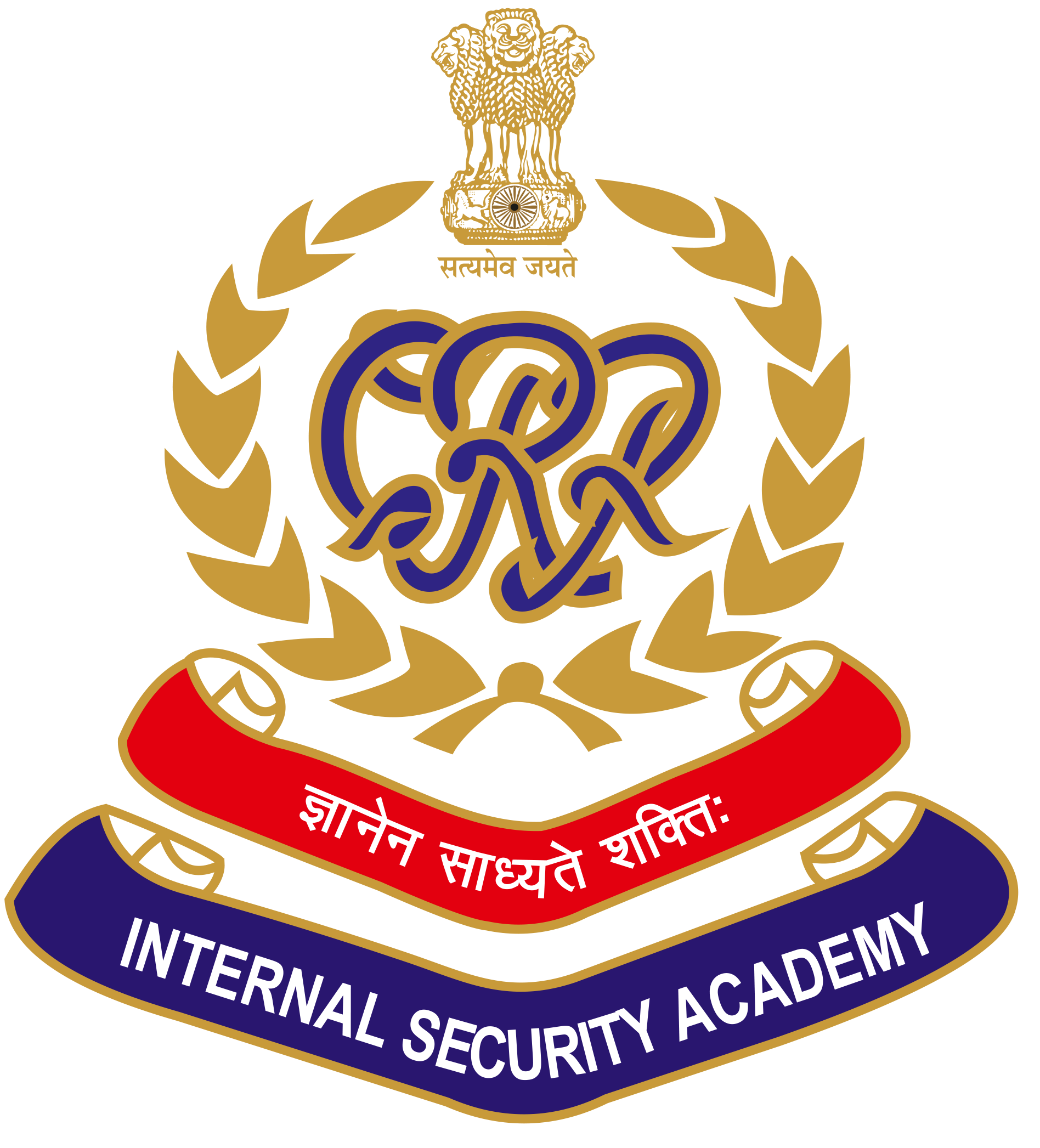

Location
- Mount Abu, Rajasthan, India; India; 24°35′35″N 72°42′47″E

Information
- Motto: Gyanen Sadhyate Shakti (Power through pursuit of knowledge)
- Founded: 1 February 1975
- Principal: Danesh Rana (Director/Inspector General)
- Affiliation: Ministry of Home Affairs, Government of India

Internal Security Academy (ISA) is a police training institute for the Central Reserve Police Force, located at Mount Abu, India.

== History ==
The academy was founded in Mount Abu, Rajasthan, on 1 February 1975, following the relocation of the Central Police Training College to Hyderabad, later renamed the Sardar Vallabhbhai Patel National Police Academy. The 1849-built Abu Lawrence School Campus of 4.5 Acres, serving as the main academy campus, was bought by CRPF in 1979.

The barracks once used by academy trainees from 1948 to 1950 now belong to the Indian Army. Originally established in 1824 by the East India Company, the Sirmoor Rifles, later known as the 5th Gorkha Rifles (Frontier Force), is the oldest Gurkha unit.

== See also ==
- CRPF Academy
