= Naresh =

Naresh (Sanskrit: नरेश Nareśa: nara "man" and īśa "lord") is a masculine given name popularly used among Hindus.

Notable people with the name include:

- Naresh (actor) (born 1960), Indian movie actor in Telugu cinema
- Allari Naresh (born 1982), Indian movie actor in Telugu cinema
- Naresh Bhandari, Nepalese politician
- Naresh Bhardwaj (born 1959), Canadian politician
- Naresh Bhuiyan (born 1951), Bangladeshi actor
- Naresh Dadhich, (born 1944), Indian theoretical physicist
- Naresh Dalal, American physical chemist
- Naresh Goyal (born 1949), Indian businessman
- Naresh Gujral (born 1948), Indian politician
- Naresh Iyer (born 1981), Indian singer
- Naresh Kamboj (born 1964), Indian politician
- Naresh Kumar (disambiguation), several people
- Naresh Mehta (1922–2000), Hindi writer
- Naresh Sohal (1939–2018), Indian composer
- Naresh Trehan (born 1946), Indian surgeon

== See also ==
- Ramnaresh Sarwan (born 1980), West Indian cricketer
- Naresh (city), city in Babylonia
