= Ochterlony baronets =

Two titles in the Baronetage of the United Kingdom

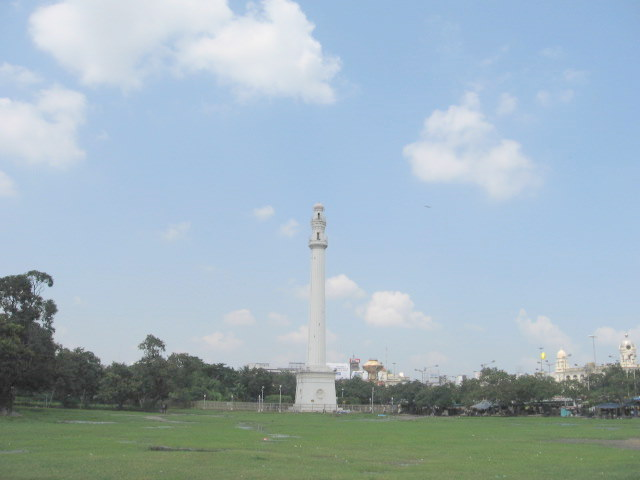
The Ochterlony Monument in Calcutta, India

The Ochterlony Baronetcy, of Pitforthy or Pitforthie in the County of Angus, and the Ochterlony Baronetcy, of Ochterlony in the County of Forfar, were two titles in the Baronetage of the United Kingdom, both created for Major-General Sir David Ochterlony. The Ochterlony Baronetcy of Pitforthy was created on 7 March 1816, with normal remainder to the heirs male of his body. The Ochterlony Baronetcy of Ochterlony was created on 8 December 1823 with remainder to Roderick Peregrine Ochterlony and the heirs male of his body. Ochterlony never married (although he had six natural children by at least two of his thirteen concubines), and on his death in 1825 the 1816 creation became extinct.

He was succeeded in the 1823 creation according to the special remainder by his natural grandson Charles Metcalfe Ochterlony (1817–1891), the son of his only son Roderick Peregrine Ochterlony, of Delhi (1785 – died by 1823) by his wife Sarah Nelly, the daughter of Lt. Col. John Nelly of the Bengal Engineers, at Allahabad, India. This creation became extinct on the death of the fifth Baronet in 1964.

== Ochterlony baronets, of Pitforthy (1816) ==
- Sir David Ochterlony, 1st Baronet (1758–1825)

Coat of arms of Ochterlony of Pitforthy
Notes The second crest is one of honourable augmentation. Crest Crest 1: A swan, wings elevated, argent, ducally collared and chained or, the breast charged with a rose, gules. Crest 2: Out of an easter crown, incribed Nepaul, and arm issuant, the hand grasping a baton of command entwined by an olive branch Escutcheon On an embattled chief two banners in saltire, the one of the Mahratta states, inscribed Delhi, the other of the state of Nepaul, inscribed Nepaul, the staves broken and encircled by a wreath of laurel Motto Prudentia et animo

== Ochterlony baronets, of Ochterlony (1823) ==
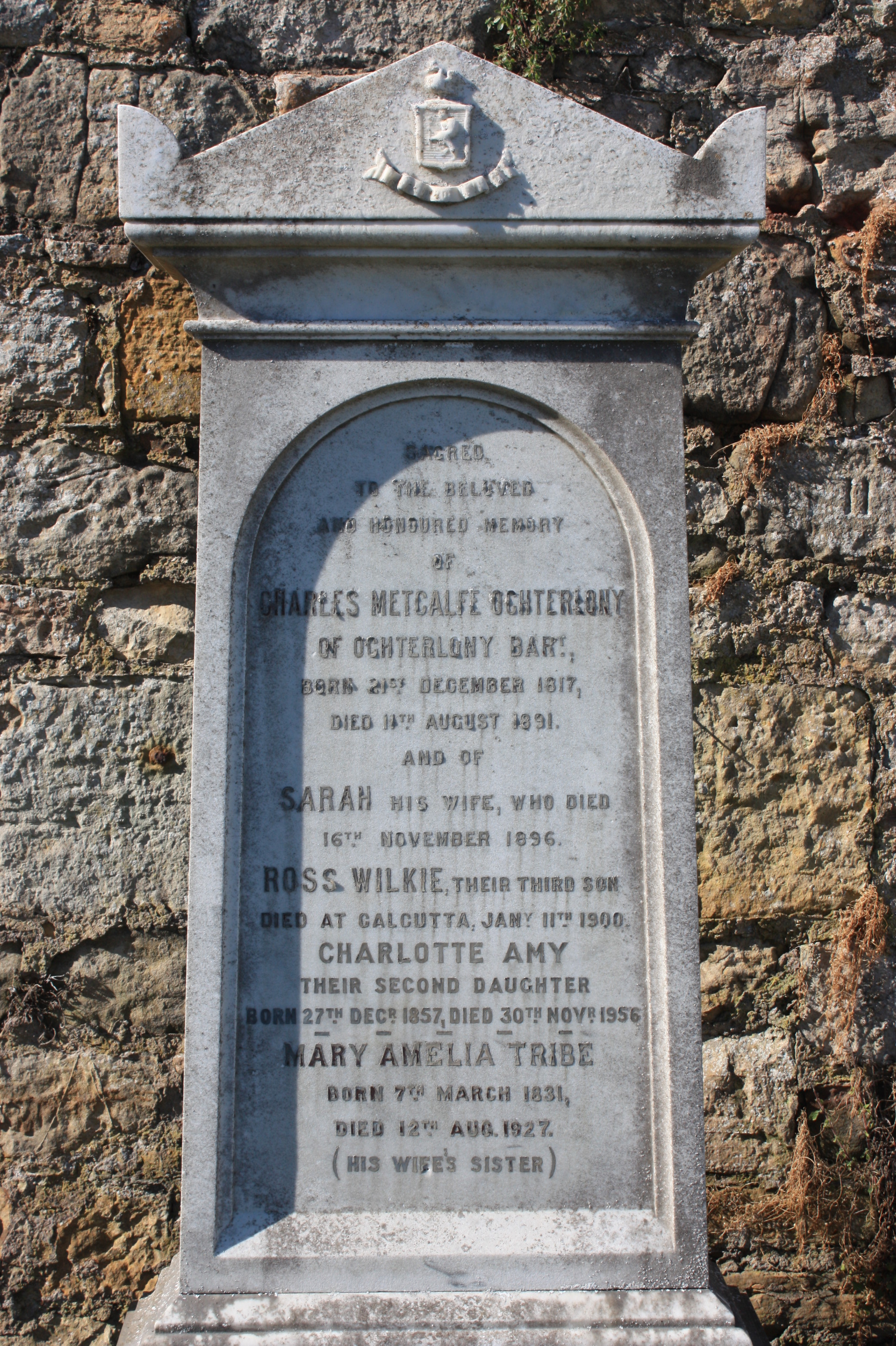
The grave of Charles Metcalfe Ochterlony, 2nd baronet, East Cemetery, St Andrews

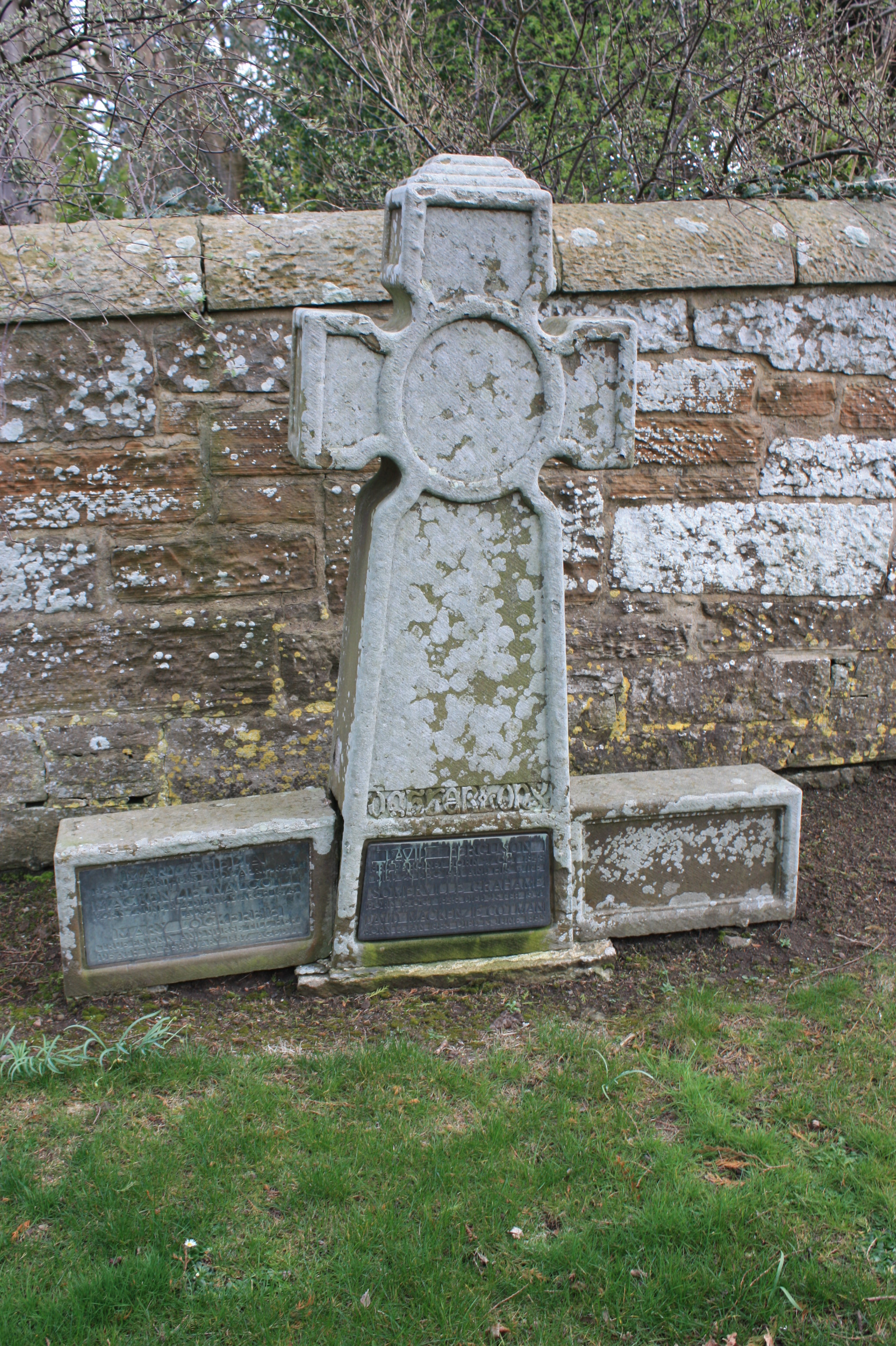
The grave of David Ferguson Ochterlony, 3rd Baronet, Currie Cemetery -prior to vandalism of 2020

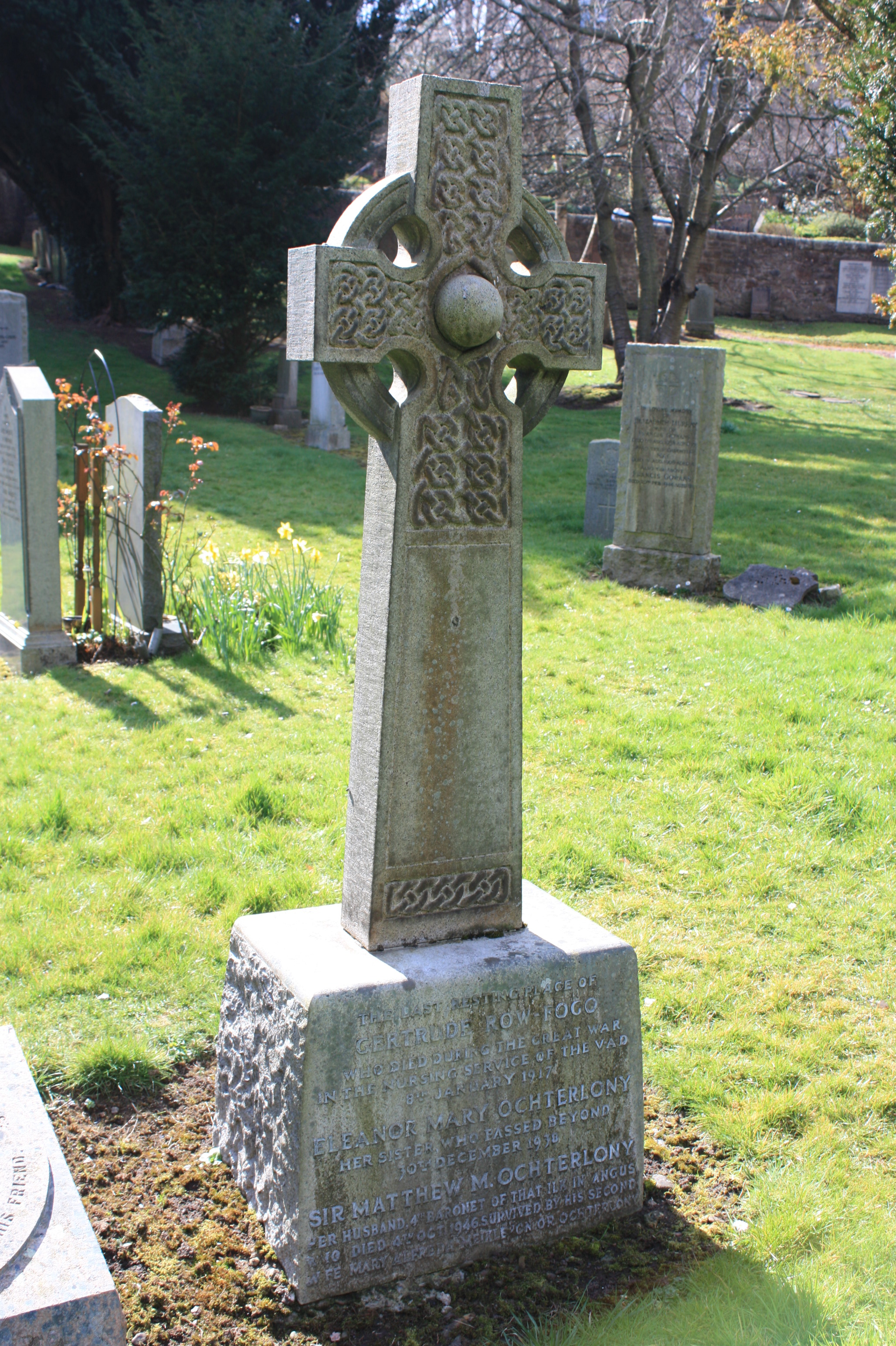
The grave of Sir Matthew Ochterlony, 4th Baronet, Colinton Churchyard

- Sir David Ochterlony, 1st Baronet (1758–1825)
- Sir Charles Metcalfe Ochterlony, 2nd Baronet (1817–1891); he married a Sarah Tribe of Liverpool, and had issue, including the 3rd Baronet, and a daughter Sarah Helen who married a Foulis baronet.
- Sir David Ferguson Ochterlony, 3rd Baronet (1848–1931)
- Sir Matthew Montgomerie Ochterlony, 4th Baronet (1880–1946) an architect
- Sir Charles Francis Ochterlony, 5th Baronet (1891–1964)

Coat of arms of Ochterlony of Ochterlony
Crest A swan, wings elevated, argent, ducally collared and chained or, the breast charged with a buckle, gules, and the wings and body debruised by a bendlet sinister wavy, azure. Escutcheon Azure, a lion rampant argent, charged on the shoulder with a key erect, wards upwards, of the field, and holding in the fore paws a trident or, all within a border, wavy, of the second, charged with four buckles gules. Motto Spe labor levis.
