= Harold Tarbolton =

British architect

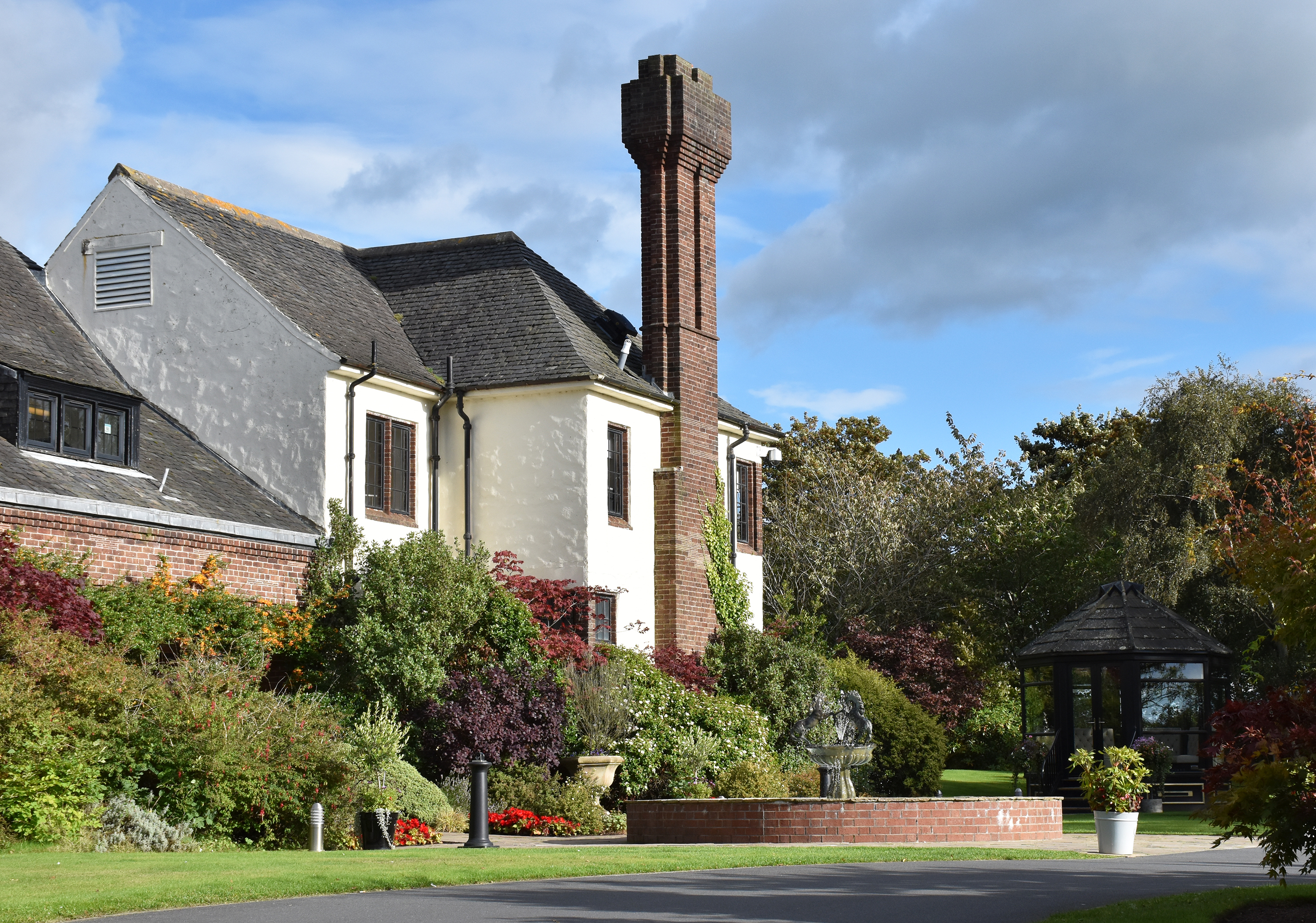
Western House, Ayr. An Arts and Crafts house design by Tarbolton (1919–25) for the Western Club. Listed building LB47172.

Harold Ogle Tarbolton FRIBA (1869–1947) was a 19th/20th-century British architect, mainly working in Scotland. He was affectionately known as Tarrybreeks. In later life he went into partnership with Sir Matthew Ochterlony to create Tarbolton & Ochterlony.

He was involved in electricity schemes from at least 1902, and ended his career overseeing several hydro-electric schemes in Scotland.

== Life ==
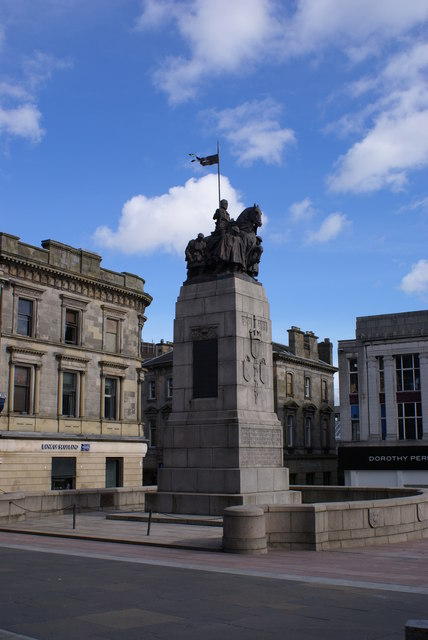
Paisley War Memorial

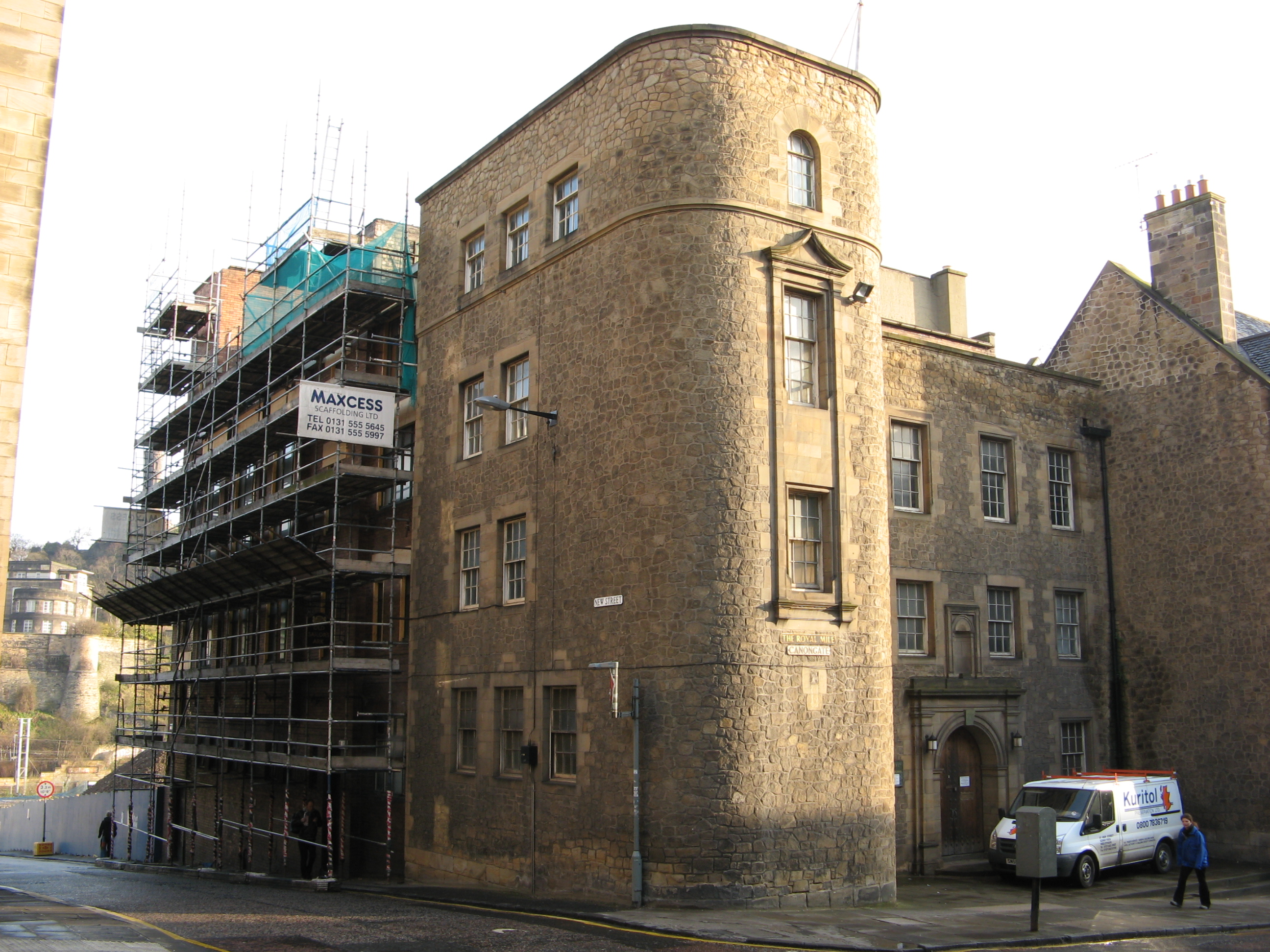
Sailors Ark, Canongate

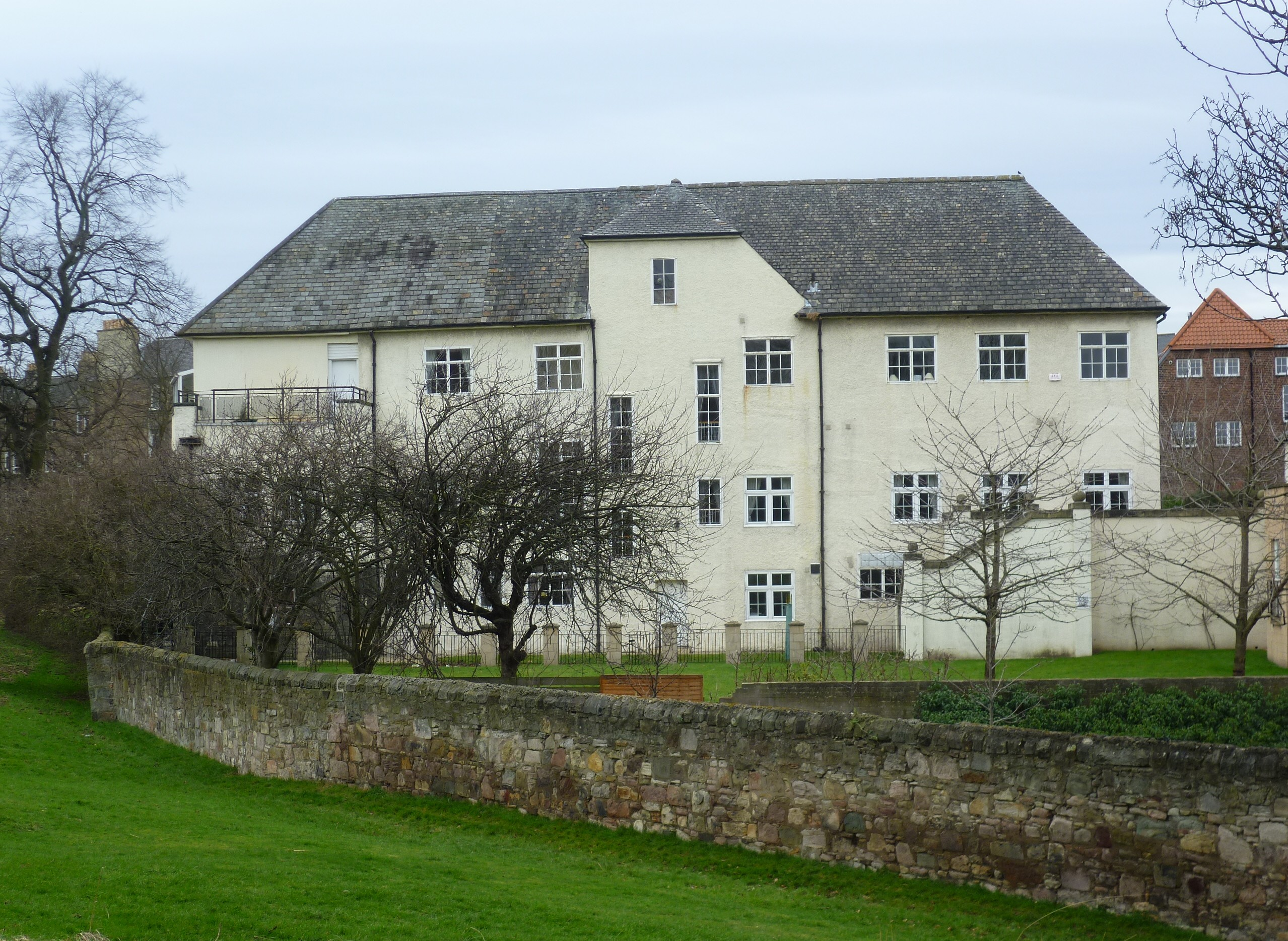
The former Elsie Inglis Memorial Maternity Hospital, Edinburgh

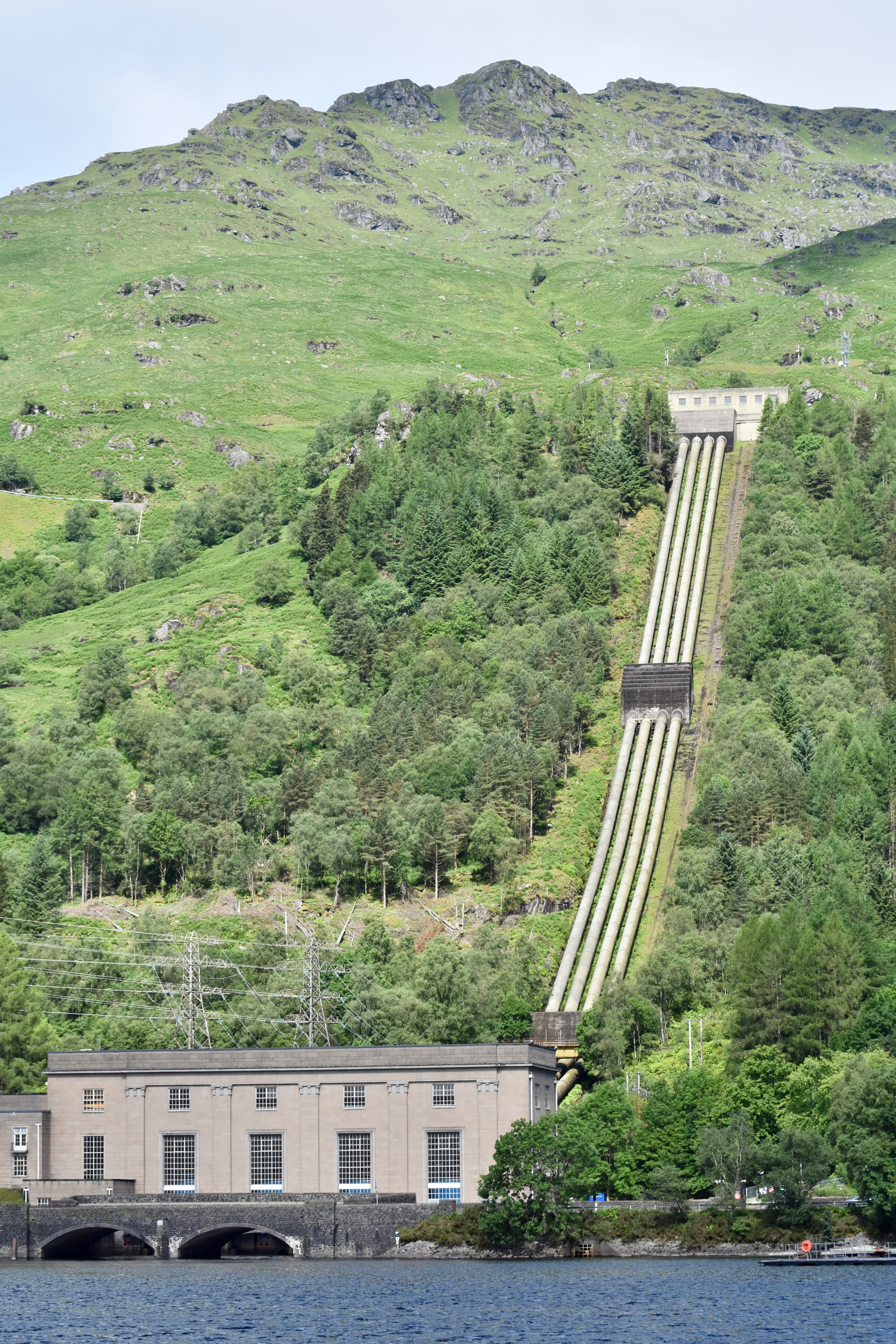
Loch Sloy Hydro Electric Scheme

Tarbolton was born in Nottingham in 1869, the son of Marriot Tarbolton, a civil engineer, and his wife, E. M. Stanfield. The family moved around and he was mainly educated at Chigwell in Essex.

He was articled to train as an architect with George Thomas Hine around 1885. After training he joined the office of Gerald Horsley in London. Here he was able to also study at the Royal Academy Schools from 1893 to 1895. He appears to have also spent some time during the same period at the University of Bonn in Germany.

In 1895 he set up practice at 7 Frederick Street in Edinburgh with Sydney Tugwell who had worked with him in London. The partnership ended by 1897 and he then was asked to join the office at John Kinross to help with work at Manderston House.

In 1900 Tarbolton moved residence to 39 Northumberland Street in Edinburgh's Second New Town. In 1907 he replaced Henderson in the firm of Henderson & Hay. He was elected RIBA in 1904. He was a Governor of the Edinburgh School of Art and of Heriot-Watt College.

In 1923 he employed Lawrence Harrower Smart to represent the firm as job architect on site for Bermuda Cathedral.

In 1926 the Edinburgh office relocated to 4 St Colme Street on the Moray Estate in the west end of the city.

In 1932 Tarbolton formed a partnership with his former junior colleague Matthew Ochterlony to create Tarbolton & Ochterlony. However, he appears to have had joint projects from 1924 onwards.

In 1938 he succeeded George Washington Browne as Royal Fine Art Commissioner, a role he served until death. He was consulting architect to both St Ninian's Cathedral, Perth and Oban Cathedral.

In 1944 Tarbolton & Ochterlony became part of the architectural advisory panel for the North of Scotland Hydro-Electric Board, along with Reginald Fairlie and James Shearer. Tarbolton & Ochterlony designed the Loch Sloy Hydro-Electric Scheme and the Tummel-Garry Scheme. Ochterlony died before the schemes were begun. Tarbolton saw the schemes built but did not live to their being commissioned.

He died of a cerebral thrombosis at his home, 3 East Castle Road in the Merchiston district of Edinburgh on 31 July 1947.

== Family ==
On 9 February 1897 at St John's Episcopal Church, Edinburgh, he married Beatrice Dudgeon Gulland (d.1943), second daughter of Charles Gulland of Millfield, Falkland in central Fife.

== Principal works ==
- St Peter's Episcopal Church, Torry near Aberdeen (1897)
- Extension to the British Linen Bank in Falkland, Fife.
- Internal refurbishment and new outbuildings at Manderston House (1900) in office of John Kinross
- Altyre House electricity generating house (1902)
- Penicuik Co-operative Emporium (1904)
- "The Peel", Clovenfords (1904) in office of John Kinross
- Buckhaven Co-operative Stores (1905)
- Internal remodelling of Kincardine-in-Menteith Church, near Blair Drummond (1907)
- Remodelling of Gardyne Castle (1910)
- Pattishall House (1910)
- Memorial to David Livingstone, St Michael and All Saints Church, Blantyre, Malawi (1913)
- Major remodelling, St Bride's Episcopal Church, Glasgow (1915)
- Western House, Ayr (1919)
- Paisley War Memorial (1920) with sculpture by Alice Meredith Williams
- Elsie Inglis Memorial Hospital (1923)
- Warrior's Chapel, Old St Paul's, Edinburgh (1924)
- Bangour Village Church (1924)
- Church of the Ascension (Episcopal), Glasgow (1925)
- Remodelling of Holy Trinity Cathedral, Hamilton, Bermuda (1926)
- Bank of Scotland, Duns (1928)
- 9 Easter Belmont Road (1933) with Ochterlony
- British Linen Bank, Dumfries (1933)
- Remodelling of Chalmers Hospital, Edinburgh (1933)
- Old Sailor's Ark, Canongate, Edinburgh (1934)
- Remodelling of Dalzell House, Motherwell (1935)
- Mathers Bar, Queensferry Street, Edinburgh (1938) now a listed building
- St David's Episcopal Church, Pilton, Edinburgh (1939) opened 1941
- Westering, Inverleith Grove, Edinburgh (1939)
- St Salvador's Episcopal Church, Saughton Main Street, Edinburgh (1939) now a listed building
- St Fillan's Episcopal Church, Buckstone, Edinburgh (1940)
- Loch Sloy Hydro-Electric Scheme (1947)
- Tummel-Garry Hydro Electric Scheme (1947)
- Loch Faskally Hydro Electric Scheme (1947)
- Aldour Bridge, Pitlochry (1949) posthumously, work executed by Sir Alexander Gibb & Partners
