= St. John's Church, Meerut =

St. John's Church
- Saint John the Baptist Church
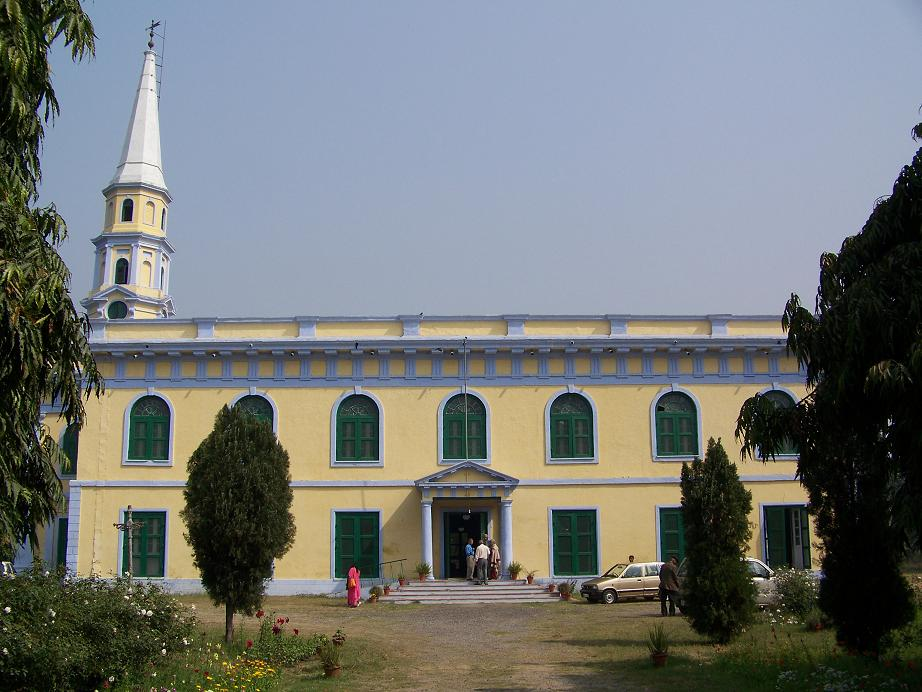
- St. John's Church, Meerut in 2009
- St. John's Church
- 29°00′45″N 77°42′32″E
- Location: Meerut
- Country: India
- Denomination: Church of North India
- Website: www.stjohnschurchmeerut.org

History
- Former name: Saint John the Baptist Garrison Church
- Status: Functional
- Founded: 1819; 207 years ago
- Founder: Rev. Henry Fischer
- Dedication: Rt. Rev. Reginald Heber (Bishop)
- Consecrated: 1821

Architecture
- Functional status: Sunday morning service
- Heritage designation: British Anglican Historical building
- Architect: Captain George Hutchinson
- Completed: 1819

Specifications
- Capacity: 3000

Administration
- Diocese: Diocese of Agra (Church of North India)

Clergy
- Bishop: Rt. Rev.Dr.P.P.Habil
- Dean: Rev. Paritosh A. Noel
- Priest: Rev. Rinvi P. Noel

The Saint John the Baptist, or John's Church, is a parish church in the diocese of Agra of Church of North India, and is located Meerut, India. The church building was built from 1819 to 1822, and is the oldest "Garrison Church" in North India.

Near to this church lies St. John's Church cemetery. The grounds contain trees and greenery.

The parish motto Unity, Witness and Service found at the entrance serves to remind parishioners and guests alike of the purpose of this church.

== History ==
The parish was founded in 1819 to serve the military garrison stationed locally. Its founder was British Army chaplain, the Rev. Henry Fischer, a Church of England clergyman, posted to Meerut, India. The parish church of St John the Baptist is the oldest church edifice in the northern half of India. It still houses a huge but non-functioning pipe organ, which employed manually operated bellows to supply the organ with air. The wooden pews and kneelers, brass eagle lectern, marble baptistry, and stained glass windows all date back nearly two centuries.

== Architecture ==
St John's church building conforms to a style of English parish church architecture popular before the Gothic Revival, and is modelled on the Palladian or classical style, which was well suited to local conditions with a large open interior space for worship in which air could circulate freely in sometimes stifling temperatures. It includes an upper seating area (balcony), no longer in use. Dating back almost 200 years, renovations have changed little to the church fabric, making it a fine example of an Anglican parish church of the early 1800s.

== Church services ==
English Sunday Service is held in the morning, and usually includes Holy Communion if a priest is available. Holy Communion is offered to baptized Christians of all major denominations. St John's Church follows the Anglican rite and Book of Common Prayer liturgy.

Normal Sunday services times are 8:30 a.m. (summer), and 9:30 a.m. (winter), with services at 10:00 a.m. on the major Christian feast days of Easter and Christmas as well as to mark the New Year. Visitors are always welcomed.

== Parish ==
Most of the parishioners of St John's Church are from Meerut, and some travel more than 50 miles to attend major services or events. Members of the congregation span almost four generations and the elders have kept alive some of the traditions of a different era. Every year during Christmas the Parish Club comes alive and with the School organizes various functions and plays both for the congregation and guests.

== St John's Church cemetery ==
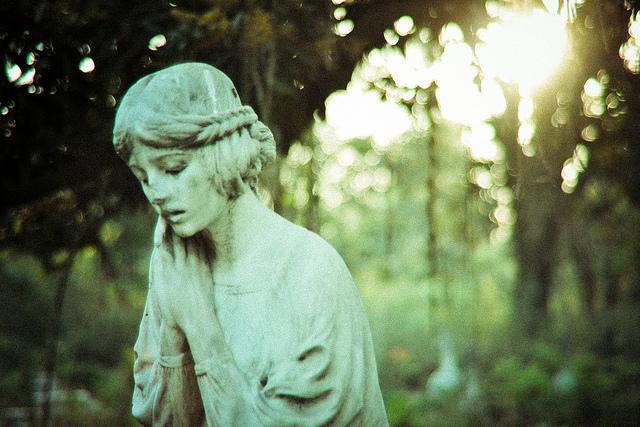
Photo of a tombstone in St. John's Cemetery, Meerut

Some of the graves are more than a century old and contain engraved headstones, carved pillars and some very elegant tombs bordering on antiquity. The older ones in the graveyard are falling apart due to weathering, and a curious visitor may have to navigate through some unfriendly underbrush and rough terrain.

=== Notable burials ===
- Sir David Ochterlony, Bt
- Sir Rollo Gillespie

== St John's school ==
The parish is home to a senior secondary school which follows the Indian C.B.S.E. curriculum and is under the auspices of the same diocese as the parish church. It is located at 117, Bank Street, a few kilometers from St John's Church building itself.
