= Naresh Kumar =

Naresh Kumar may refer to:

- Naresh Kumar HN, Indian film director and a screenwriter who works in Kannada cinema
- Naresh Kumar (tennis) (1928–2022), Indian tennis player
- Naresh Kumar Shad (1927–1969), Urdu Ghazal and writer of Qat'aa and Rubai
- Naresh Kumar (wrestler) (born 1965), Indian wrestler who competed at the 1988 Summer Olympics
- Nareish Kumar, Fiji Indian politician
- Naresh Kumar (CRPF officer), Indian police officer
