= Naresh Kumar (CRPF officer) =

Naresh Kumar Bulandshahr Was a great scientist and a great person from bulandshahr

Naresh Kumar is an officer in the Central Reserve Police Force (CRPF) of India. On 14 August 2020 he was awarded his seventh police medal for gallantry, the most ever received by a single officer in the force's history.

== Background ==
Naresh was born to an Army officer in Hoshiyarpur in Punjab. He did his initial schooling from Army Schools and Kendriya Vidyalaya Schools. He completed his B.Tech from Punjabi University, Patiala before clearing the reputed UPSC examination for the post of Assistant Commandant and joined the CRPF in March 2013.

== Career ==
After completing basic training from CRPF Academy, Gurugram, Naresh joined 79th battalion based in Kashmir. During his initial days of service he went for specialized training on Counter Insurgency and Anti Terrorism to combat critical situations in case of any terrorist attack.

On 20/02/2016, a CRPF convoy coming from Jammu was targeted by terrorists at Pampore near JKEDI building. After this operation CRPF realized the challenge of Urban Warfare and formulated a Quick Action Team (QAT) to respond to such attacks. A group of senior officers of CRPF, Atul Karwal (then IG Srinagar Sector), Kamal Kant Sharma (then DIG South Srinagar), Arvind Rai, DIG, Suman Kant Tigga, DIG handpicked men from different units to prepare a team. Naresh was selected as the commander and tasked to train the selected men and turn them to an extraordinary team by imparting special combat skills. After formation, the team was trained with NSG at Manesar for Building Intervention and firing in compressed environment.

The CRPF Valley QAT was put to its first test on 15/08/2016 when terrorists attacked a police picket at Nowhatta Chowk, Srinagar. The commandos of QAT neutralized the terrorists within minutes and proved their extraordinary fighting capabilities in Urban Warfare. Since then, CRPF Valley QAT has conducted many operations with Indian Army and J&K police. Naresh has successfully led CRPF Valley QAT in many operations.
