= CRPF Valley QAT =

Counterterrorism unit

CRPF Valley Quick Action Team
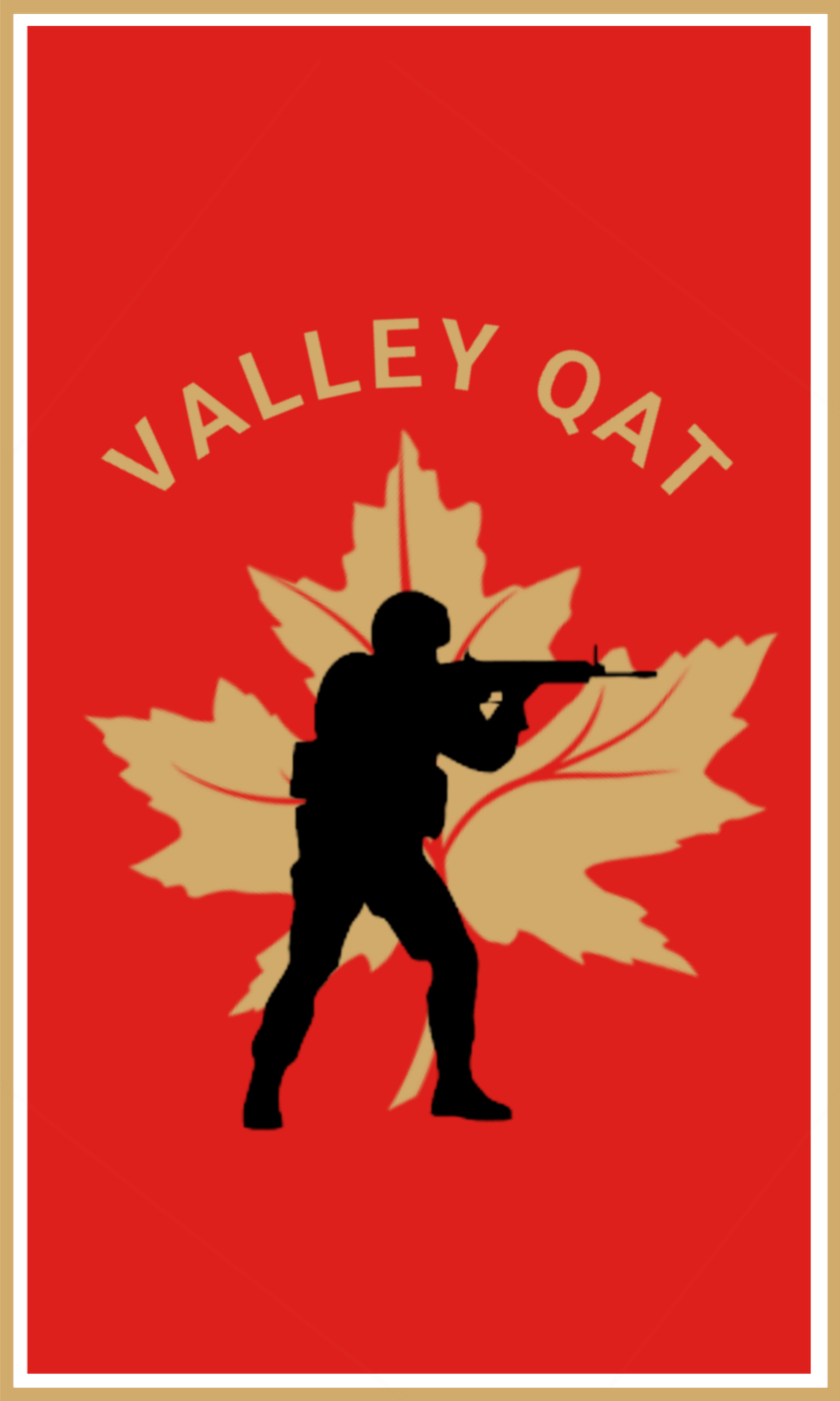
- Quick Action Team Chest Insignia
- Active: 2011–present
- Country: India
- Agency: CRPF
- Type: Tactical Unit
- Role: Counter terrorism and Counter-insurgency in Urban settings; Direct action; Covert operations; Close Quarters Combat; Cordon and Search; Room Intervention
- Operations jurisdiction: Kashmir Valley
- Headquarters: Brein Nishat, Srinagar
- Common name: Valley QAT

Structure
- Active personnel: 126 (2023)

Commanders
- Current commander: Inspector General Ajay Kumar Yadav
- Notable commanders: Inspector General Charu Sinha

The CRPF Valley Quick Action Team is a tactical unit of the Central Reserve Police Force, specialized in counterterrorism in urban areas. It is active in the city of Srinagar, Jammu and Kashmir. It was raised specifically to counter and eliminate militants in the city of Srinagar. It conducts operations with the Jammu and Kashmir Police.

== History ==
The Valley QAT was initially created in 2011 to escort and provide security for convoys and VIPs. In 2016, an attack on a BSF camp near the Srinagar International Airport ended with the team killing all the attackers. After the incident, the team was converted into a specialised urban combat operations force. Since then, the unit has conducted 42 missions leading to the deaths of 77 terrorists, including militant commanders, and has won numerous gallantry awards. In 2021, women were allowed to begin serving with the unit. As of April 2023, the unit has 108 men and 18 women who serve in the Kashmir Valley as a part of the team.

== Personnel ==
The Valley QAT consists of CRPF troopers who volunteer to serve with the unit. Interested volunteers who are deemed to match the physical fitness requirements for serving in the unit have to undergo a stringent selection process and specialised training. Those who pass the training are inducted into the unit and stationed in the valley.

=== Training ===
Troopers have to be under 35 years of age in order to serve with the unit. Volunteers who are deemed to match the physical fitness requirements are first shortlisted and posted in a CRPF unit operating inside the Jammu and Kashmir to make themselves familiar with the region. They are then sent to the Counter Insurgency and Terrorism (CIAT) training centre in Shivpuri, Madhya Pradesh, where they are trained in counterterrorism and counterinsurgency for a period of 7 weeks. Additionally, the team is trained in high-risk house intervention, raids, cordon and search missions, detection of improvised explosive devices, advanced weapons handling, and close quarters combat in conditions similar to the urban terrain of the valley. By the end of their training, troopers are expected to effectively participate in urban counterterrorism operations, endure challenging physical conditions, and have knowledge about the tactical aspects of counterterrorism operations. Those who pass the training process are posted with a quick action team unit in the Kashmir Valley.

== Equipment ==
=== Weapons and protective gear ===
Name	Image	Type	Origin	Notes
Exfil High Cut Ballistic Helmet		Combat helmet	United States	In service.
Patka(Model- 3)	Patka Helmet of the Indian army	Combat helmet	India	In service.
TATA Advanced Combat Helmet	Tata Ballistic helmet	Combat helmet	India	In service.
Glock		Semi-automatic pistol	Austria	Glock 17 and Glock 19 used as primary service pistols.
TAVOR X-95		Assault Rifle/Carbine	Israel	Generally used for special operations and not for patrol.
Heckler & Koch MP5	MP5 Submachine Gun	Submachine gun	West Germany	Standard submachine gun of the QAT.
JVPC		Submachine gun	India	Used along with MP5.
AR-M1		Assault Rifle	Bulgaria	Modified versions used as service rifles along with their variants AR-M1F, AR-M1F41, and AR-M5F41 by some troopers.
Trichy assault rifle		Assault Rifle	India	In service, used by some troopers as an alternative to X95 and AR-M1.
Heckler & Koch PSG1		Sniper rifle	Germany	Status:Used along with Steyr SSG1.
Steyr SSG 69		Sniper rifle	Germany	Used along with PSG1.
Vidhwansak		Anti-material rifle	India	Used for shooting through materials from long range in urban operations.
FN Minimi		Light machine gun	Belgium	2nd gen version used for providing overwhelming firepower in close quarters combat.
Shivalik		Hand grenade	India	Used as a hand grenade and with rifles.
ARDE 40MM UBGL		Underbarrel grenade launcher (40mm)	India	Main underbarrel grenade launcher of the QAT.
Multi Grenade Launcher 40mm		Multi grenade launcher (40mm)	India; South Africa	Semi-automatic six-shot 40mm x 46mm low velocity grenade launcher, with extended range used in counterterrorism operations.
Carl Gustav M3/M4		Recoilless rifle (84mm)	India; Sweden	M3 and M4 variants used for urban anti-terrorism operations.

=== Vehicles ===
Vehicle	Origin	Function
Sherpa Light	France	Armored Transport Vehicle
Mahindra Marksman	India	Armored Transport Vehicle
Ashok Leyland Critical Response Vehicle	India	Armored Transport Vehicle

== Gallantry Awards ==
Deputy Commandant Rahul Mathur was awarded the Kirti Chakra for his bravery during anti-terrorism operations while serving with the QAT. Anirudh Pratap Singh was presented with the Shaurya Chakra for his bravery during a counterterrorism operation conducted by the QAT.

President Droupadi Murmu presented Shaurya Chakra to Satendra Singh and Amit Kumar for their bravery during counterterrorism operations conducted on 28 June 2021 and 12 October 2020 by the QAT. Naresh Kumar and Loukrakpam Ibomcha Singh have each received 7 and 4 gallantry medals, respectively, for their service with the unit. The unit was awarded 15 gallantry medals during India's 2020 Independence Day celebrations.
