= Sir Matthew Ochterlony, 4th Baronet =

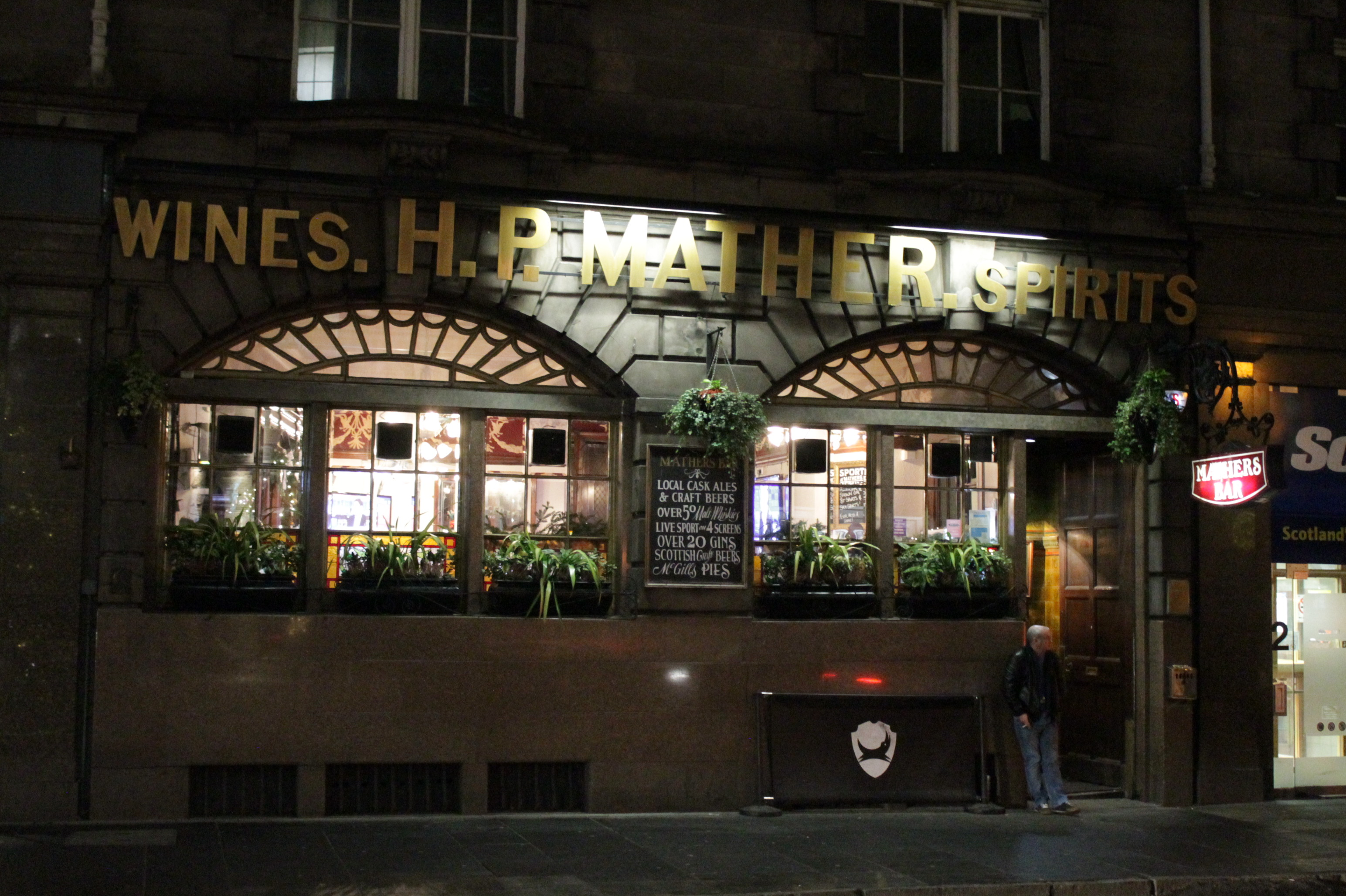
Mathers Bar, Queensferry Street, Edinburgh

Sir Matthew Montgomery Ochterlony FRIBA (28 February 1880 – 4 October 1946) was a 20th-century Scottish baronet and architect.

He largely received commissions for large villas for monied friends, but in later years did much work for the Scottish Episcopal Church (including stained glass design). He ventured into hydro-electric schemes at the end of his career.

== Life ==
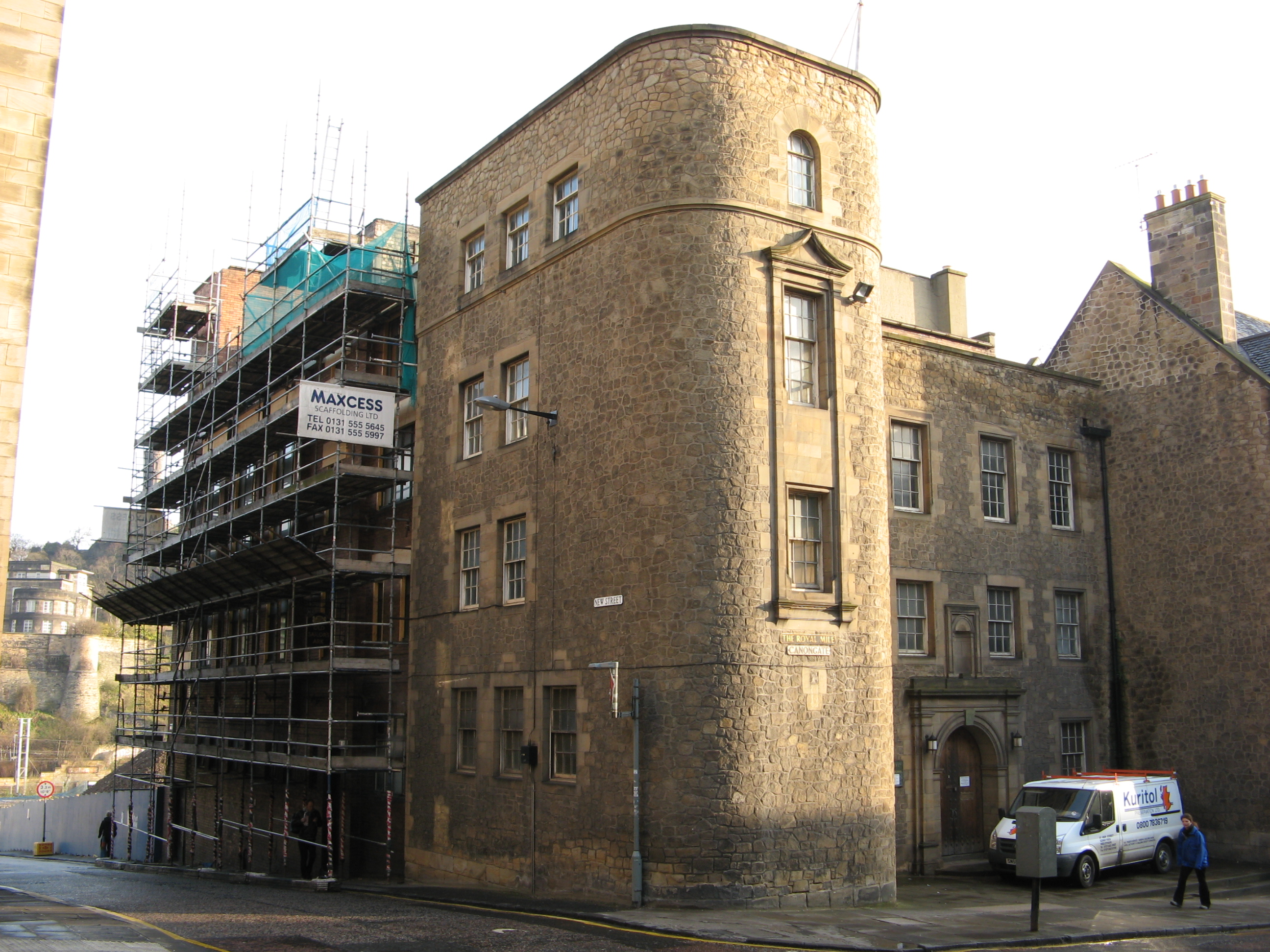
Sailors Ark, Canongate

Bar interior, Mathers Bar, Queensferry Street, Edinburgh

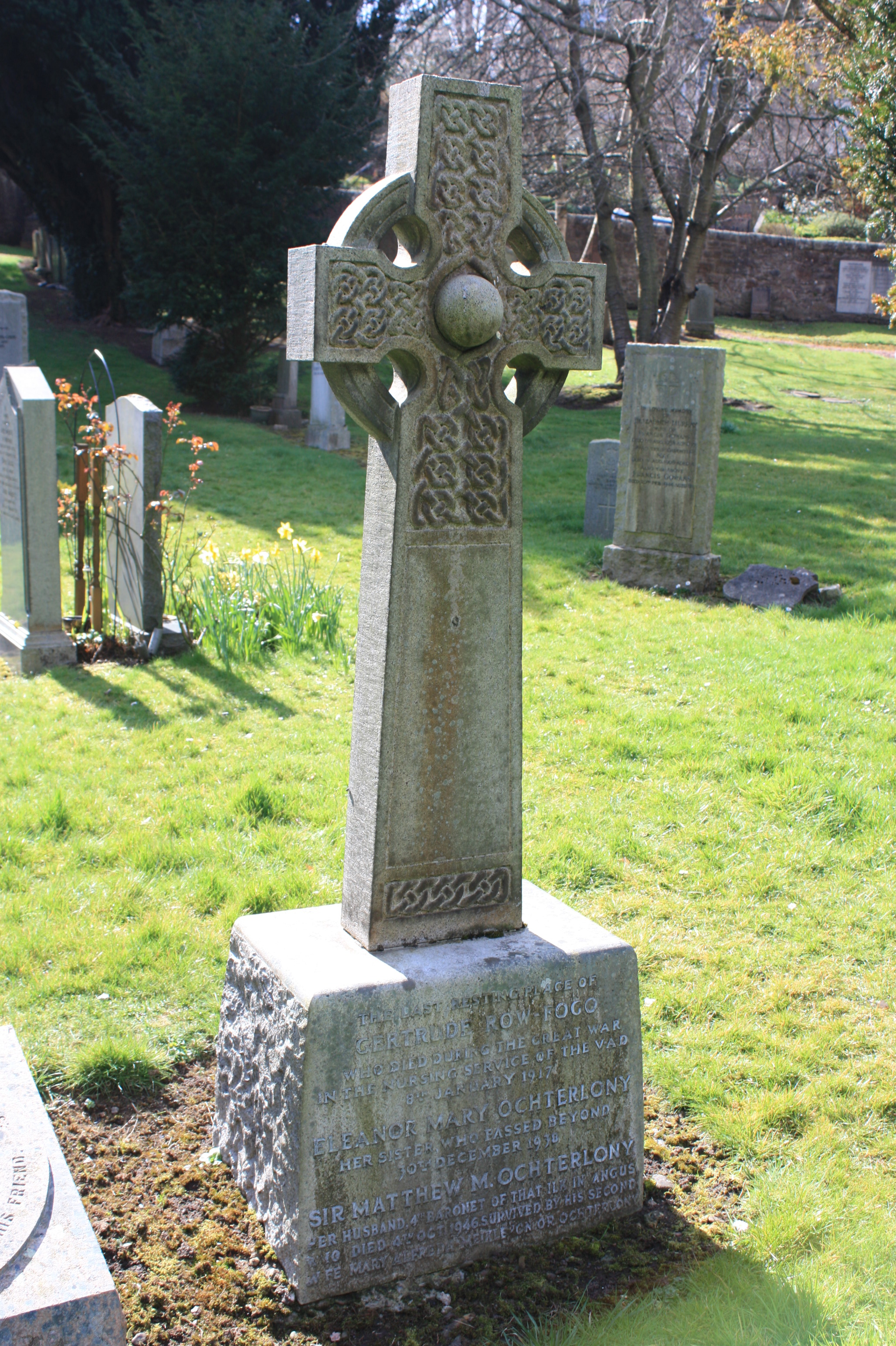
The grave of Sir Matthew Ochterlony, 4th Baronet, Colinton Churchyard

He was born on 28 February 1880 at Balmadie House in Juniper Green, south-west of Edinburgh, the son of Sir David Ochterlony, 3rd Baronet of Ochterlony. He was educated at the Edinburgh Institution from 1892 to 1894.

In 1899 he was articled to John Kinross and Harold Tarbolton to train as an architect, based at 2 Abercromby Place in Edinburgh, also studying at Edinburgh School of Applied Art. He took a break due to ill-health 1902 to 1905 and became involved in woodwork and stained glass. He returned to architecture in 1905 again with Kinross and Tarbolton. In 1911 he joined John More Dick Peddie.

In 1916 he enlisted into the Royal Army Service Corps as a private. He was demobbed in 1919 and briefly returned to Peddie's office before joining the office of Hippolyte Blanc at 25 Rutland Square in 1920. In 1923 he set up on his own at 18 Melville Street. In 1929 he moved to 2 Coates Crescent. In 1932 he formed a partnership with his old colleague Harold Tarbolton to create Tarbolton & Ochterlony.

He designed many large villas in the Colinton and Juniper Green district, close to his family home.

From around 1924 he lived at Spylaw Cottage, a house in Colinton modified for his own use. In 1931 his father died and he became the 4th baronet Ochterlony.

He is responsible for the Baptistry stained glass window in Colinton Parish Church in memory of his father David.

In 1944 Tarbolton & Ochterlony became architectural advisors to the Scottish Hydro Electric Board. They created the schemes for Loch Sloy, Pitlochry and Tummel-Garry. None of their projects came to fruition during their lifetimes.

He died in Colinton on 4 October 1946. He is buried in the northern section of Colinton churchyard.

== Family ==
In 1921 he married Eleanor Mary Lawrie Fogo, granddaughter of architect John Fogo. Eleanor died in 1938, and in 1942 he got engaged to Mary Alfreda Meiklejon.

== Principal works ==
- Creation of a new Ochterlony family home, Balmadie(s) House, 65 Spylaw Bank Road (1914)
- Warrior's Chapel, Old St Paul's, Edinburgh (1924)
- St Columba's Episcopal Church Hall, Westgarth Avenue, Colinton (1925)
- Lectern, Dunfermline Abbey (1930)
- 9 Easter Belmont Road (1933)
- Extension and remodelling of St Columba's Episcopal Church, Colinton (1934)
- Old Sailor's Ark, Canongate, Edinburgh (1934)
- Inverewe House (1937)
- Mathers Bar, Queensferry Street, Edinburgh (1938) now a listed building
- St David's Episcopal Church, Pilton, Edinburgh (1939) opened 1941
- Westering, Inverleith Grove, Edinburgh (1939)
- St Salvador's Episcopal Church, Saughton Main Street, Edinburgh (1939) now a listed building
- St Fillan's Episcopal Church, Buckstone, Edinburgh (1940)

Baronetage of the United Kingdom
Preceded by David Ochterlony	Baronet (of Ochterlony); 1931–1946	Succeeded by Charles Ochterlony
