= Shaheed Minar, Kolkata =

Shaheed Minar
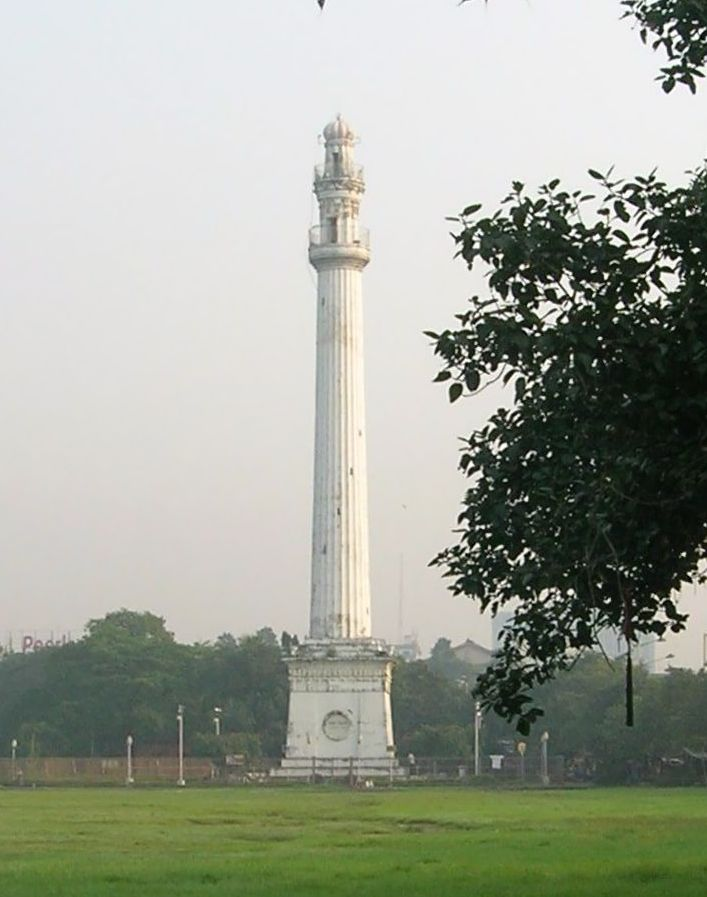
- The Shaheed Minar as seen from the Brigade Grounds
- Former names: Ochterlony Monument

General information
- Status: Used as a monument and owned by the Government of West Bengal
- Type: Monument
- Architectural style: Foundation based on: Egyptian, Column of: Syrian, Cupola of: Turkish
- Location: Kolkata Maidan, 11, Rani Rashmoni Avenue, Kolkata, West Bengal, India
- Coordinates: 22.56286°N 88.34923°E
- Construction started: 1825
- Completed: 1828
- Renovated: 2011–present
- Owner: Government of West Bengal

Height
- Height: 48 m (157 ft)

Design and construction
- Other designers: J. P. Parker

The Shaheed Minar (English: Martyrs' Monument), formerly known as the Ochterlony Monument, is a monument in Kolkata that was erected in the 1800s.

During 1969, it was rededicated to the memory of the martyrs of the Indian freedom movement and renamed the "Shaheed Minar," which means "martyrs' monument" in both Bengali and Hindustani.

== Features ==
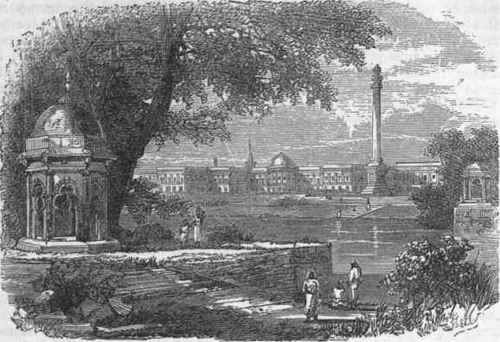
An old depiction of Shaheed Minar (visible at right)

Known as the "Cloud kissing Monument" by Mark Twain, the Shaheed Minar is located at Esplanade in Central Kolkata. The tower is 48 metres (157 ft) high. It has a foundation based on the Egyptian style. The column is a combination of styles with a classical fluted column, a Syrian upper portion, and a Turkish dome. It has two balconies and a total of 223 steps. The monument was erected by Burn & Company.

== Shaheed Minar Maidan ==
Since 1931, events have been held here. The central bus terminus of the city is around the monument.

== Public use ==
The government has planned to open the monument after the renovation work.

After the work is completed, both tourists and locals will have access.

== Gallery ==
Shaheed Minar Gallery

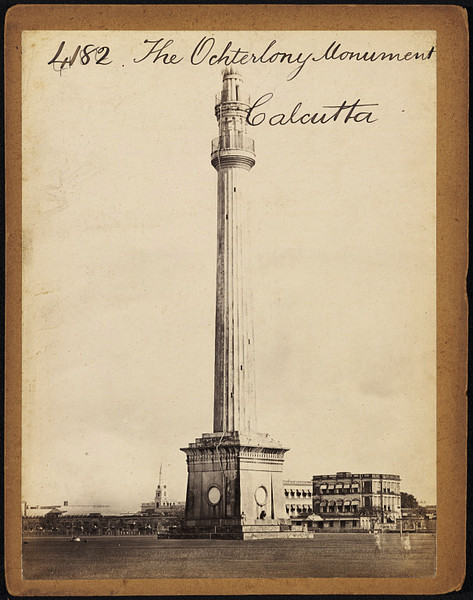
Photograph by Francis Frith

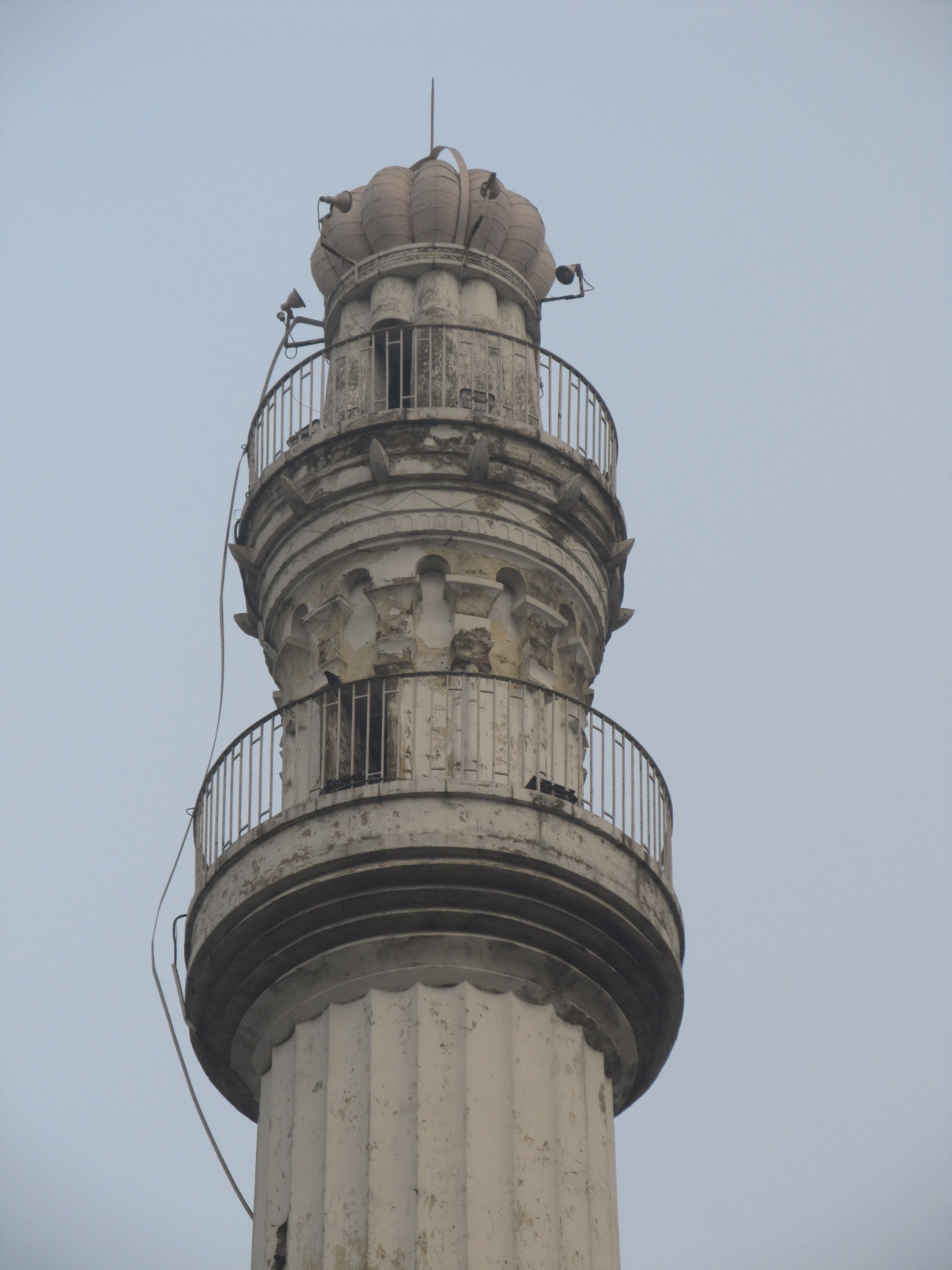
The cupola of Shaheed Minar, before renovation

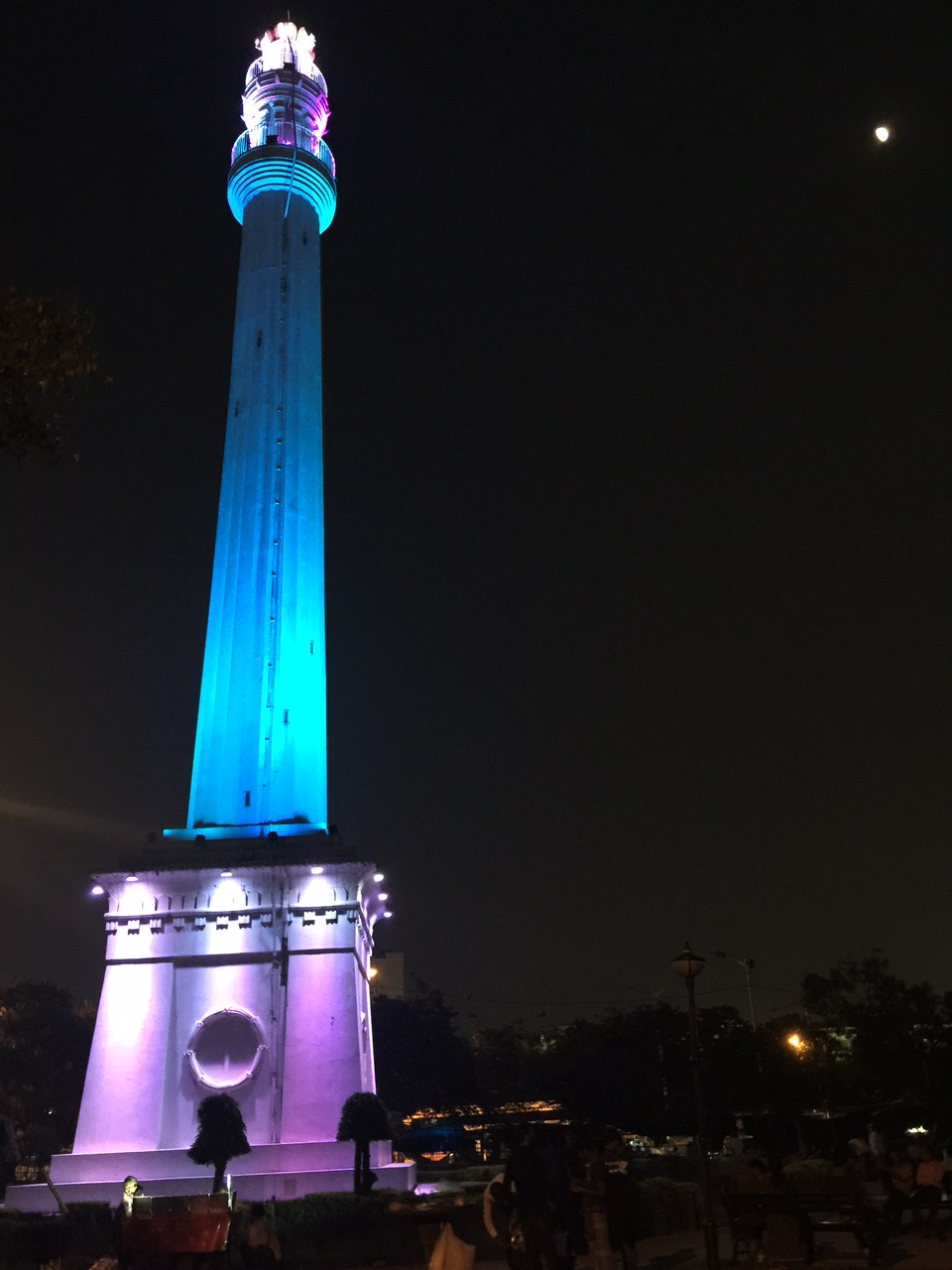
Shaheed Minar night view

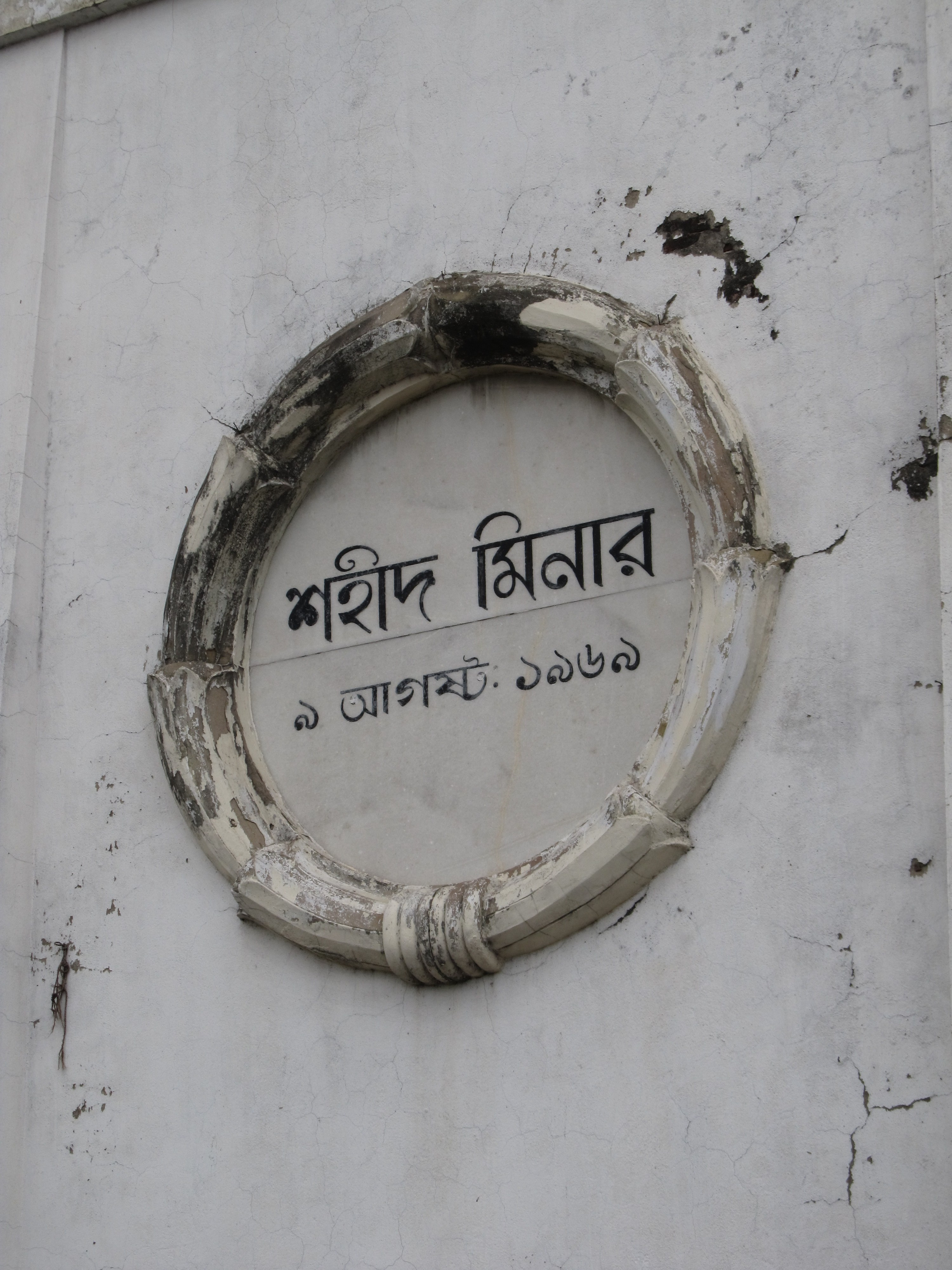
The plaque embedded in the wall of the monument, which reads that it was dedicated to the memory of the martyrs of the Indian freedom movement on August 9, 1969

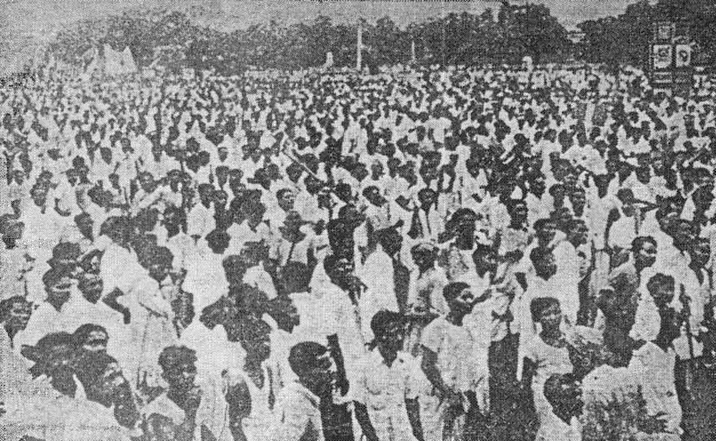
A crowd assembled at the foot of the Ochterlony Monument in Kolkata, to attend a meeting of the Muslim League on the Direct Action Day (16 August 1946)

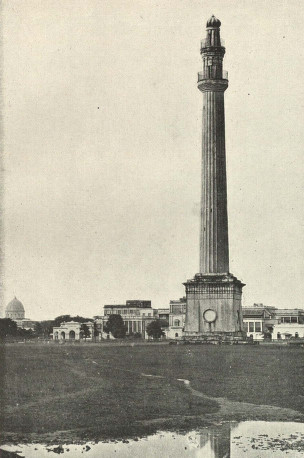
Ochterlony Monument, c. 1905

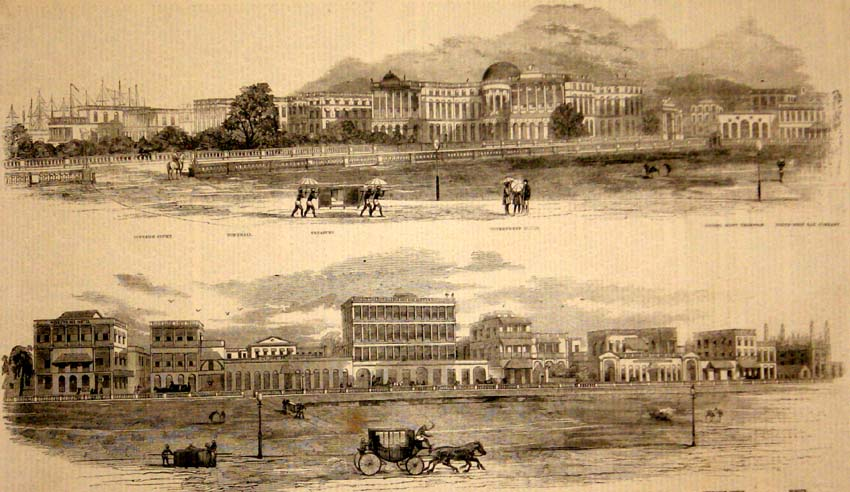
"View of the Esplanade, Calcutta, taken from the foot of the Ochterlony Monument, from a drawing by Major T. J Ryves," from the Illustrated London News, 1859
