= CRPF Academy =

Police academy in Haryana, India

Central Reserve Police Force Academy

- The Union Home Minister, Rajnath Singh at CRPF Academy, in Kadarpur, Gurgaon, 2016.

Agency overview
- Formed: 23 March 2002; 24 years ago
- Type: Police training institution
- Jurisdiction: Government of India
- Headquarters: Kadarpur, Gurugram, Haryana, India; 28.3801°N 77.0905°E
- Agency executive: Sunil Joon, Additional Director General and Director
- Parent department: Ministry of Home Affairs
- Parent agency: Central Reserve Police Force
- Website: crpf.mha.gov.in/Training/CRPF-Academy

The Central Reserve Police Force Academy (CRPF Academy) is an officer training institution of the Central Reserve Police Force (CRPF), located at Kadarpur, Gurugram, Haryana, India. Spread over 308 acres (125 ha), the academy provides training to officers of the largest paramilitary force in India, with 312,707 personnel as of July 2026.

== Overview ==
The training of directly recruited gazetted officers of the CRPF began in 1961 at Mount Abu and was subsequently conducted at Neemuch and the Internal Security Academy, Mount Abu. Subsequently, the foundation of a dedicated officer training academy was laid on 23 March 2002 by then Union Home Minister L. K. Advani at Kadarpur. The training commenced in October 2005 with the 37th batch of directly appointed gazetted officers. The academy celebrates 1 September 2009 as its Raising Day.

Each year, the CRPF Academy was the venue for the annual CRPF Raising Day Parade. It commemorates India's first Home Minister, Vallabhbhai Patel, presenting colours to the force on 28th December 1949, when the force, formerly known as the Crown Representative's Police, received its present name after the enactment of the Central Reserve Police Force Act, 1949.

== Training ==
The CRPF Academy conducts a 52-week basic training programme for Directly Appointed Gazetted Officers (DAGOs), selected through the all-India, Central Armed Police Forces (Assistant Commandants) Examination conducted by the Union Public Service Commission (UPSC).. Upon successful completion of their training, the officers are inducted into various battalions of CRPF as Assistant Commandants, the entry-level rank for Group A officers in the CRPF and command a company formation of around 100 personnel.

The academy also conducts training programmes for Departmentally Enlisted Gazetted Officers (DEGOs), medical officers and instructors, besides specialised courses in internal security, counter-terrorism, crisis management and police administration. The CRPF Academy has collaborations with National Law University, MDI Gurugram for professional inputs during the year-long training.

== See also ==
- Internal Security Academy
