= List of retired equipment of the Danish Army =

== Equipment used by the Home Guard ==
This list includes the phased-out equipment used exclusively by the Home Guard.

=== Weapons ===
Name	Image	Origin	Type	Calibre	Note
GRK M/203 (Diemaco; M203 grenade launcher)		United States	Grenade Launcher	40×46 mm	Used by Home Guard units, fits on M95/96 rifles. Can only fire low velocity 40 mm Can use multiple grenade types: Lethal: HE FRAG; HEAT; Flechette(Used in Afghanistan; unknown if still in use); Less Lethal: Rubber Buckshot; Smoke; Flash; Sponge
Let Støttevåben M/04 (Diemaco; LSW)		Canada	Light support weapon	5.56×45mm NATO	Used by Home Guard units Issued with: ELCAN LMG C79 3.4×; Drum magazine; Got the informal nickname of Lorte Spasser Våben ("Shitty retard weapon") because it "was a weapon designed to do everything but couldn't do anything".
SR-25 (Knight's Armament Company; SR-25)		United States	Designated marksman rifle	7.62×51mm NATO	Used by SSR (Home Guard Special Operations Unit)
HK417 (Heckler & Koch; HK417 20)		Germany	Designated marksman rifle	7.62×51mm NATO	Transferred to the Home Guard after the phase-out in the army and now in use

=== CBRN ===
Name	Image	Origin	Type	Notes
CBRN Maske M/93 (S10 NBC Respirator)		United Kingdom	CBRN-Mask	Phased out CBRN-Mask Still around in the Home Guard

=== Tactical and communication equipment ===
Name	Image	Origin	Type	Notes
PRR M/07 "Bowman" (Personal Role Radio)		United Kingdom	UHF Radio	Was used by HBU Conscripts but has been phased out by the Sepura STP9000 Tetra. Still used by some Home Guard units

== Equipment in storage ==
This list include recently retired equipment still in storage.

=== Weapons ===
==== Pistols ====
Name	Image	Origin	Type	Calibre	Note	Retirement from active use
M/49 Neuhausen (SIG Combibloc Group; P210)		Switzerland	Pistol	9×19mm NATO	After its replacement by the P320, around 20.000 still remain in storage until a disposal method can be found. The guns can not be destroyed due to the financial loss and can not be sold due to their HMAK/FMI government stamp and the fear they may end up in OPFOR hands on the second hand market	2019
Pistol M/?? (Heckler & Koch; USP9 SD)		Germany	Pistol	9×19mm NATO	Was used by Protection teams, Frømandskorpset and Jægerkorpset Replaced by SIG Sauer P320 X-Carry and SIG SauerP365 Same situation as the Neuhausen: in storage until disposal method is found.	2019
Pistol M/?? (Glock; 17)		Austria	Pistol	9×19mm NATO	Used by Frømandskorpset Replaced by SIG Sauer P320 X-Carry and SIG SauerP365 Same situation as the Neuhausen in storage until disposal method is found.	2019

==== Sub-machine guns ====
Name	Image	Origin	Type	Calibre	Note	Retirement from active use
Maskinpistol M/49 (Carl Gustafs stads gevärsfaktori M/45)		Sweden (Designed) Denmark (Manufactured)	Sub-Machine gun	9×19mm NATO	Phased out in favor of telescopic M/75s and later M/96s. Still around at bases for exercise OPFORs Was manufactured as a copy of the M/45 in Denmark under a license from Carl Gustafs Stads Gevärsfaktori Later replaced by the MP5 until the concept of the sub-machine gun was completely dropped in 2010 by the Danish defense, in favor of compact carbines. (Note: MP5 is not on this list, as the remaining stock was transferred to Rigspolitiet)	1975

==== Carbines and assault rifles ====
Name	Image	Origin	Type	Calibre	Note	Retirement from active use
Gevær M/75 (Heckler & Koch; G3)		Germany	Battle rifle	7.62×51mm NATO	Phased out, but there are still 15.000 in storage for the total defense to a level where it was questioned in Folketinget	1995

==== Light machine guns ====
Name	Image	Origin	Type	Calibre	Note	Retirement from active use
H&K 23E (Heckler & Koch; 23E)		Germany	Light machine gun	5.56×45mm NATO	Used by Jægerkorpset at the start of the Afghanistan war as the M/62 was too heavy Replaced by the FN Minimi [See LMGs] and current status is unknown	2014
Let Maskingevær M/62 (Rheinmetall; MG3)		Germany	General-purpose machine gun	7.62×51mm NATO	The infantry variant has been phased out with the Home Guard acquisition of the M60 Many informal names like Nazisaven ("The Nazi saw"), Hitlersaven ("The Hitler saw"), or Jødesaven ("The Jew saw")	2014

==== Marksman rifles ====
Name	Image	Origin	Type	Calibre	Note	Retirement from active use
Skarpskyttergevær 7,62x51 (Heckler & Koch; MSG90)		Germany	Designated marksman rifle	7.62×51mm NATO	Retired in 2007 in favour of the HK417. Status unknown	2007

==== Man-portable air-defense system ====
Name	Image	Origin	Type	Calibre	Note	Retirement from active use
Raytheon Missiles & Defense; FIM-92 Stinger		United States	MANPAD	70 mm Infrared homing missile	Have been in cold storage for years; some were donated to Latvia in 2018 and in 2020 the Danish army was debating their reintroduction	2010-2014

==== Artillery ====
Name	Image	Origin	Type	Calibre	Quantity	Notes	Retirement from active use
Let Mortér M/06		Spain	Mortar	60mm	100+	Made by Expal Phased out due to defects making it inaccurate and causing catastrophic failures	2020

=== Personal equipment ===
==== Helmets ====
Name	Image	Origin	Type	Camo	Notes	Retirement from active use
Hjelm M/96 (SPECTRA helmet)		United States	Ballistic Helmet		The former standard helmet that was in service from 1996 to 2024 Phased out for M/20 Operationel and M/20 Basic Massive stores left on bases currently	2023

==== Load-carrying equipment and personal protection equipment ====
Name	Image	Origin	Type	Protection level	Camo	Notes	Retirement from active use
Fragmentationsvest M/2000		Unknown	Fragmentation Vest	Fragmentation protection		Limited use	2012
Kamp Vest M/05		Unknown	Load carrying system	N/A		Limited use	2012

=== Vehicles ===
==== Armoured ====
Name	Image	Origin	Type	Quantity	Calibre	Notes	Retirement from active use
General Dynamics European Land Systems - Force Protection Inc; Mastiff III		United States	Infantry mobility vehicle	9	12.7×99mm NATO	Used for EOD	Unknown moved to retired as status is unknown
Mowag; Duro III 6x6		Switzerland	Multi-purpose military transport vehicles	29	N/A	Armored ambulance. Bought in 2006. Unknown if the ambulance model of the Piranha V is a replacement as the army no longer states it as materiel on their material page.	Unknown moved to retired as status is unknown
AM General; HMMWV Jülkat		United States	Reconnaissance vehicle	22	12.7×99mm NATO; 7.62×51mm NATO	Danish modification made by Composhield A/SUsed for: Patrol; Support; Open Reconnaissance	Unknown moved to retired as status is unknown
M113 G4 DK		United States	Armoured personnel carrier	Unknown	12.7×99mm NATO	Replaced by Piranha V 54 APC models have been donated to Ukraine, exact number left is unknown. Few remain on bases and are used for MBU training and Open House events at bases	2019-2023
M41 DK-1		United States	Light tank	53 (originally) Unknown (current)	76mm 7.62x51 NATO	Light tank gifted by the Americans in 1962 A few kept around as display pieces at bases and for Åben Hede	2000
Centurion MKV 2 DK		United Kingdom	Main battle tank	216 (originally) Unknown (current)	105 mm 7.62x51 NATO	Custom Danish model, introduced in 1953 and upgraded in the 1980s A few kept around as display pieces at bases and for Åben Hede Replaced by the Leopard 1	1994
Krauss-Maffei; Leopard 1A5-DK		Germany	Main battle tank	230 (originally) Unknown (current)	105 mm 7.62x51 NATO	Introduced in 1973 and upgraded to the A5 DKstandard in the 1990s Replaced by the Leopard 2 A few kept around as display pieces at bases and for Åben Hede including the white UN Leopard 1 that took part in Operation Bøllebank Base chassis still serves as the Wisent 1 and Bieber 100 models have been renovated and donated to Ukraine	2005

==== Artillery ====
Name	Image	Origin	Type	Calibre	Quantity	Notes	Retirement from active use
BAE Systems Inc. SKH M109A3DK		United States	Tracked Self-propelled howitzer	155 mm	76(originally) Unknown (current)	Retired in 2020 as the Caesar 8×8 was supposed to have entered service that year. 76 were purchased originally but most were scrapped or cannibalised through the 2010s A few kept around as display pieces at bases and for Åben Hede	2020

== Test equipment ==
=== Pistols ===
Name	Image	Origin	Type	Calibre	Note
Izhevsk Mechanical Plant; PM "Makarov"		Soviet Union	Pistol	9×18mm Makarov	Held by UMAK(UddannelsesMAterielKontoret -Training material office) for weapon identification training purposes
Tula Arms Plant; TT-30 "Tokarev"		Soviet Union	Pistol	7.62×25mm Tokarev	Held by UMAK(UddannelsesMAterielKontoret -Training material office) for weapon identification training purposes

=== Carbines and assault rifles ===
Name	Image	Origin	Type	Calibre	Note
Kalashnikov Concern; AK-74		Soviet Union	Assault rifle	5.45×39mm	Used as a test weapon by Hærens kampskole to test equipment for Afghanistan and Iraq Held by UMAK(UddannelsesMAterielKontoret -Training material office) for weapon identification training purposes Used by the army for weapon familiarisation to help train foreign militaries such as the ANA, the Iraqi Armed Forces and the Cameroon Armed Forces
Kalashnikov Concern; AKM		Soviet Union	Assault rifle	7.62×39mm	Used as a test weapon by Hærens kampskole to test equipment for Afghanistan and Iraq Held by UMAK(UddannelsesMAterielKontoret -Training material office) for weapon identification training purposes Used by the army for weapon familiarisation to help train foreign militaries such as the ANA, the Iraqi Armed Forces and the Cameroon Armed Forces

=== Marksman rifles ===
Name	Image	Origin	Type	Calibre	Note
Kalashnikov Concern; SVD "Dragunov"		Soviet Union	Designated marksman rifle	7.62×54mmR	Used as a test weapon by Hærens kampskole to test equipment for Afghanistan and Iraq

=== Machineguns ===
Name	Image	Origin	Type	Calibre	Note
Kalashnikov Concern PKM		Soviet Union	General-purpose machine gun	7.62×54mmR	Used as a test weapon by Hærens kampskole to test equipment for Afghanistan Used by the army for weapon familiarisation to help train the ANA and the Iraqi Armed Forces

=== Anti-materiel rifle ===
Name	Image	Origin	Type	Calibre	Note
Ordnance Factory Tiruchirappalli; Vidhwansak		India	Anti-materiel rifle	14.5×114mm	Used as a test weapon by Hærens kampskole to test equipment

=== Anti-tank weapons ===
Name	Image	Origin	Type	Calibre	Note
NPO Bazalt; RPG-7		Soviet Union	Rocket-propelled grenade	Ammunition in stock unknown	Used as a test weapon by Hærens kampskole to test equipment for Afghanistan Used by the army for weapon familiarisation to help train the ANA and the Iraqi Armed Forces Around 8000, alongside some further 29.000 rockets were donated to Ukraine

== See also ==
- Forsvaret
- List of Danish military equipment of World War II
- List of active Royal Danish Navy ships
- Royal Danish Air Force
- Ranks and insignia of Royal Danish Army
