= RT-20 =

RT-20 is the designation applied to two distinct military systems:

- RT-20 (missile), the Soviet missile
- RT-20 (rifle), the Croatian rifle
