= .60 caliber =

Prototype heavy machine gun cartridge

.60
- Type: Anti-tank rifle, heavy machine gun cartridge
- Place of origin: United States

Production history
- Designed: 1939

Specifications
- Parent case: .50 BMG
- Case type: Rimless, bottleneck
- Bullet diameter: 0.60 in (15.2 mm)
- Overall length: 4.48 in (114 mm)
- Primer type: B

The .60 caliber rifle cartridge is a 0.60x4.48 inch (15.2×114 millimeter) rimless, bottlenecked rifle and machine gun cartridge developed in the United States beginning in 1939. Initially developed as an anti-tank rifle cartridge, it was later unsuccessfully considered as replacement for the .50 caliber round in U.S. service, particularly in the air-to-air machine gun role. Numerous prototype machine guns were tested to fire the .60 caliber round and several types of ammunition were developed, including armor-piercing, high-explosive, and incendiary rounds, among others. The .60 caliber round ultimately did not represent enough of an improvement over the in-use .50 caliber rounds.

While the .60 caliber is not known to have been utilized operationally, it was modified to become the 20x102 mm round, which remains the standard U.S. 20 mm round to this day, utilized by the M61 Vulcan rotary cannon, among other weapons.

The cartridge is sometimes erroneously referred to as the "T17" after one of the weapons designed to fire the cartridge.

== History ==
The .60 caliber was originally intended to be an anti-tank rifle cartridge capable of penetrating 1.25 inches (32 mm) of tank armor at 500 yards (460 m), a step up from the 0.9 inches (23 mm) at 200 yards (180 m) of the 0.50 Browning. By the time it was ready for service, tanks invariably had much more armor than the .60 was designed to penetrate, and it was not put into service in its original role.

The Germans had developed a very similar 15 mm round, and like the US, abandoned it when it proved too small for use against newer tanks. They then developed a new heavy machine gun based on it, the MG 151/15, primarily as an aircraft weapon. A number of these were captured early in the war, and some made their way to the US. As the German 15 mm round was similar in size and performance to the then-abandoned U.S. .60 cartridge, and with interest in a weapon more powerful than the M2 Browning, the MG 151/15 was adapted into a weapon known as the T17 heavy machine gun, sometimes referred to as a "cannon". This did not reach service during the war.

In the immediate post-war there was some development of a system mounting four T17 guns and a radar in a towable mounting known as the "Stinger", proposed as a new anti-aircraft gun to replace the M45 Quadmount. Development continued until 1951, when a change to require longer range led to a series of events that would lead to the FIM-43 Redeye a decade later.

The US Air Force (USAF) also considered the T17 as an aircraft gun, as well as a version using the same cartridge but necked down to mount the .50 BMG bullet known as the .50/60. The .50/60 had a very high muzzle velocity, over 4,000 foot per second (1,200 m/s), which made it much easier to aim in combat. The resulting cartridge and weapon-combination did not represent a significant improvement over the extant .50 BMG and further development of both the .50/60 cartridge and the .60 cartridge proper was halted. However, a predecessor to the M61 Vulcan, a U.S. rotary cannon, the T45, fired the .60 cartridge.

During the war, the Germans had concluded the 15 mm round lacked power in the aircraft role, and had developed a new 20 mm round by necking out the cartridge and fitting it with the "mine shell" from the MG FF cannon. This formed the basis of the MG 151/20, which would go on to be their primary aircraft weapon for the rest of the war.

The USAF, reaching the same conclusion with their .60 experiments, did the same to adapt the .60 to a 20 mm explosive shell as part of their M39 cannon and T45 project. This became the 20x102, which remains the standard US 20 mm round to this day.

== Ammunition ==
The ammunition was largely based-on the T1/T1E1 anti-tank rifle, which utilized a 15.2x114 mm round.

Much like the British attempts to turn their stocks of obsolete .55 Boys anti-tank cartridges into a native-designed heavy machine gun cartridge, the .60-caliber cartridge was repurposed as an autocannon cartridge to succeed the older .50 Browning. The ammunition and the T17 cannon were produced from 1942 to 1946 but never proved a substantial improvement over the .50 Browning and the M2HB and M3 heavy machine guns. The cartridge was later shortened and necked up to produce the 20×102mm Vulcan autocannon round.

- .60 armor-piercing [15.2×114mm T1 Rifle] - A 1180-grain (76.5-gram) kinetic penetrator projectile with a velocity of 3,600 feet per second (1,100 m/s) for a muzzle energy of over 34,000 ft./lbs. (46 kilojoules).
- .60 T32 ball [15.2×114mm T17 machine gun]
- .60 T77 ball [15.2×114mm T17 machine gun]
- .60 T36 incendiary [15.2×114mm T17 machine gun]
- .60 T39 armor-piercing incendiary [15.2×114mm T17 machine gun]
- .60 T60 armor-piercing incendiary [15.2×114mm T17 machine gun]
- .60 T19 high-explosive [15.2x114mm T17 machine gun] — Contained 4.93 grams of pentolite and "inflicted considerable damage" on replica aircraft during testing.
- .60 T68 high-explosive incendiary [15.2x114mm T17 machine gun] — Contained 1.62 grams of IM-11 (a mixture of 50% barium nitrate and 50% powdered aluminum/magnesium alloy) and 0.90 grams of tetryl; ammunition was subject to "cook-off" and the round was not pursued.
- .60 T91 high-explosive incendiary [15.2x114mm T17 machine gun] — Contained 3.62 grams of unspecified high-explosive and incendiary "mixture".

== .60 caliber weapons ==
• T1 anti-tank rifle; the original weapon designed for the .60 caliber cartridge circa 1939. The weapon was abandoned in-light of tank armor becoming increasingly thicker and stronger. The only known variants are the T1 and T1E1.

• T17 machine gun (sometimes referred to as an "autocannon"); designed in 1943 and heavily-inspired by the German MG 151/15 and MG 151/20, the weapon was intended to replace the .50 caliber M2HB, particularly in aircraft use. Known variants are the T17, T17E1, T17E2, T17E3, T17E4 and the T17E5.

• T18 machine gun (sometimes referred to as an "autocannon"); designed circa 1943-1943, the T18 was a Hispano-Suiza 20 mm cannon (known as the 20 mm "M2" and "M3" cannons in U.S. service) modified to fire the .60 caliber cartridge. As a "radical redesign" of the existing 20 mm cannon would have been necessary to produce a .60 caliber version en masse, development halted. Known variants include the T18 and T18E1.

• T19; design which never left the "drawing board" stage. Little is otherwise known.

• T31 machine gun (sometimes referred to as an "autocannon"); designed from late 1944 into early 1945, the design was similar to the T18 in that it would be a modification of U.S. 20 mm cannons and would be required to include a "'flywheel inertia locking,' continuous belt feed, and a rate of fire in excess of 1,000 rounds per minute and "[to be] capable of fire interruption (fired from a closed bolt)." The project was abandoned in November 1945 after breaking after firing "a few rounds" during a test. The T31 was the only known variant of this line.

• T39 machine gun (sometimes referred to as an "autocannon"); A development of the T17E3, modified "in that it has an electric bolt and bolthead, interchangeable with the percussion bolt, and a contact switch with the necessary wiring to an external power source to fire electrically primed ammunition." Known variants include the T39 and T39E1.

• T41 machine gun (sometimes referred to as an "autocannon"); Another development of the T17E3, modified with "two new and three modified components to provide a gas assist to the short recoil method of operation." The T41 is the only known variant of this line.

• T45 machine gun (sometimes referred to as an "autocannon"); a motorized revolver cannon design, considered to be the initial prototype of the Vulcan cannon. Rate-of-fire was 6,000 rounds per minute.

Data from: The Machine Gun: History, Evolution, and Development of Manual, Automatic, and Airborne Repeating Weapons. By George Chinn. Pages 9-16, volume III, parts VIII and IX, Bureau of Ordnance, United States Department of the Navy via the United States Government Printing Office, 1953.

== See also ==
14.5 × 114 mm, Soviet equivalent anti aircraft heavy machine gun cartridge.
