= FIM-43 Redeye =

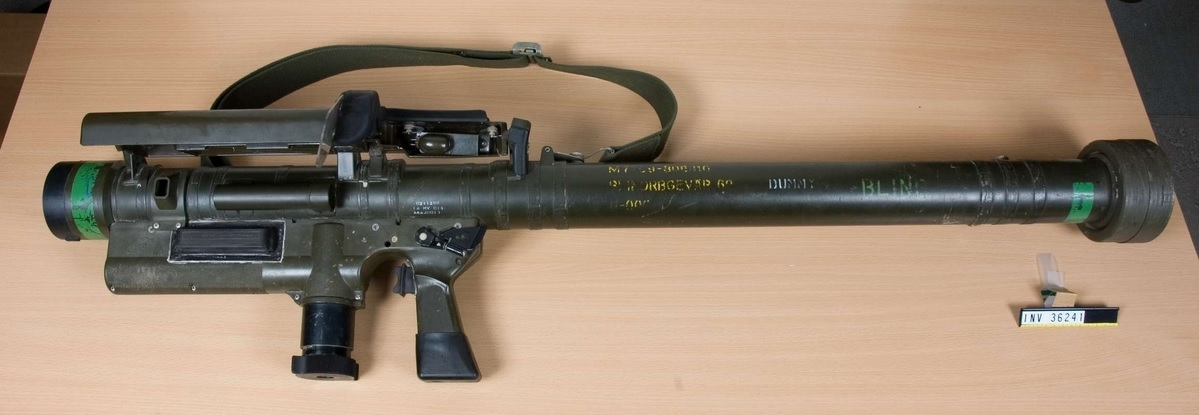
- Inert FIM-43 Redeye
- Type: Man-portable surface-to-air missile
- Place of origin: United States

Service history
- In service: 1967–1995
- Used by: See operators
- Wars: Vietnam War; Soviet–Afghan War; Nicaraguan Revolution; Lebanese Civil War; Salvadoran Civil War

Production history
- Designer: Convair
- Designed: July 1959
- Manufacturer: General Dynamics
- Developed into: FIM-92 Stinger
- Produced: 1962–1973
- No. built: 85,000
- Variants: See variants

Specifications (FIM-43C)
- Mass: 29 lb (13 kg)
- Length: 49.7 in (1.26 m)
- Diameter: 2.75 in (70 mm)
- Crew: 2 (team leader and gunner)
- Effective firing range: 1,600–18,000 ft (500–5,500 m)
- Warhead: High-explosive fragmentation
- Detonation mechanism: Impact Fuze
- Engine: Rocket, solid propellant, two-stage (ejector and sustainer)
- Maximum speed: Mach 1.6 (528 m/s)
- Guidance system: Passive infrared homing and proportional navigation

The General Dynamics FIM-43 Redeye is a man-portable surface-to-air missile system. It uses passive infrared homing to track its target. Production began in 1962 and – in anticipation of the Redeye II, which later became the FIM-92 Stinger – ended in the early 1970s (production for the US Army continued until 1969. Afterwards, production was extended until 1973 to fulfill export orders) after about 85,000 rounds had been built. The Redeye was withdrawn gradually between 1982 and 1995 as the Stinger was deployed, though it remained in service with various armed forces of the world until quite recently, being supplied via the Foreign Military Sales program. It was initially banned from being sold overseas, to avoid missiles falling into the hands of terrorist organizations. However, after the export ban was lifted, the weapon was never actually used by terrorists against civil aircraft, in contrast with other MANPADS. While the Redeye and 9K32 Strela-2 (SA-7) were similar, the missiles were not identical. Nonetheless, the CIA concluded that the Soviet SA-7 had benefited from the Redeye's development.

== Development ==
=== Post-war developments ===
In May 1946, the War Department Equipment Board published a report on the future of infantry weapons. They called for the development of new weapons that would be the best in the world, while also being able to be separated into loads of no more than 25 pounds (11 kg). When considering anti-aircraft weapons, they concluded that the M45 Quadmount mounting four M2 Browning machine guns would not be capable against future high-performance aircraft. They published a new requirement for a weapon suitable for engagements between 25 and 2,500 yards (23 and 2,300 m) against targets flying up to 1,000 miles per hour (1,600 km/h).

In response, in June 1948 the United States Army Ordnance Corps began development of the "Stinger" system, essentially an updated version of the Quadmount mounting four T17 machine guns firing the more powerful 0.60 round and aimed by an automated radar system. Development on this system continued until 1951, when the requirement was extended to 14,000 feet (4,300 m), which could not be met by the 0.60 round. A new concept using a revolver cannon firing a new 37 mm round emerged, but proved too complex and was cancelled.

=== Porcupine and Octopus ===
At the 1950 Tripartite Conference in London, the US, UK and France agreed that the M2 would remain effective up until about 1960, but new weapons would be needed after that time. This led to development of the Porcupine and Octopus concepts in the US. Porcupine, started in 1951, was a 64-barrel rocket launcher firing salvos of 2.75-inch (7.0 cm) Folding-Fin Aerial Rockets (FFARs) at an effective rate of 6,000 rounds per minute. The system was never built in complete form, and cancelled in February 1956. Octopus, from 1953, re-examined the .50 and .60 rounds, as well as the emerging 20 mm round based on the latter. This project also failed to deliver an operational system.

By the mid-1950s, new medium and high-altitude surface-to-air missile (SAMs) were rendering higher altitude flight increasingly dangerous, and attack aircraft were now expected to fly at low altitudes. This led to a 1954 requirement for a lightweight system able to engage targets from 0 to 1,000 ft (300 m), and larger weapons that raised the ceiling to 10,000 ft (3,000 m). In order to improve its capability in poor visibility, it was suggested that the weapon be aimed using infrared homing.

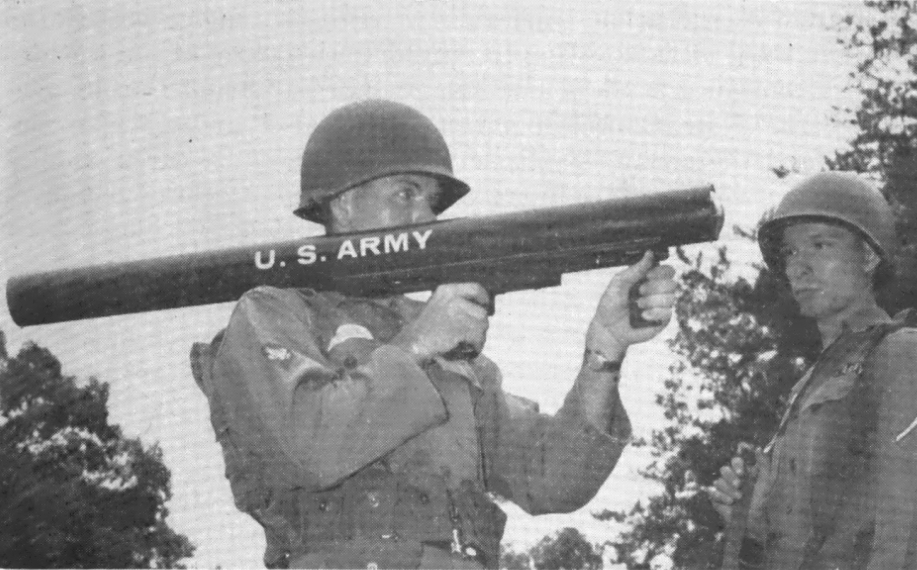
A 1959 mock-up of a Redeye prototype. The final design became larger and heavier as development progressed

=== Redeye emerges ===
In 1955, Convair, recently purchased by General Dynamics, began examining a weapon that would fill both of these requirements. When initial studies proved promising, in January 1956 the company began an 11-month study which they named "Redeye" due to its infrared seeker. To lower prototype costs, the missile would initially be based on the unguided FFAR, which was already in widespread production. This would be turned into a missile by replacing the contact-fused warhead of the FFAR with a new seeker system and smaller 1.2-pound (0.54 kg) warhead. Convair's prototype initially used a miniaturized version of the AIM-9 Sidewinder seeker and was small, weighing 14.5 lb (6.6 kg), a grip stock/launch tube weighing 3.2 lb (1.5 kg). The overall weight of the prototype was 18.2 lb (8.3 kg), while unit cost was initially estimated at $700 (equivalent to $8,289 in 2025) compared to about $3000 (equivalent to $35,526 in 2025) for a Sidewinder missile.

The resulting concept mockups were demonstrated to the Army and Marine Corps in November 1956. Simulations suggested that it would have an average miss distance of 4 to 8 feet (1.2 to 2.4 m), and a direct-hit probability of 0.35 to 0.40. The design proved extremely interesting, and in 1957 official requirements were formulated. This led to the Army's Redstone Arsenal receiving several unsolicited proposals for similar weapons from other companies:

- Lancer, a crew-served partially portable surface-to-air missile system, designed by the Drone and Missile Flight Control Department (Note: Merged with other subdivisions to form Sperry Surface Armament Division later that year.) of Sperry Gyroscope, Garden City, New York
- SLAM (Shoulder-Launched Antiaircraft Missile), a man-portable surface-to-air missile system, designed by the Autonetics Division of North American Aviation, Downey, California
- an undesignated system by Lockheed Missile Systems Division, Sunnyvale, California (Col. James E. Linka, a supervising officer with OCRD Air Defense and Missiles Division, responsible for Stinger, later recalled that Lockheed entered the competition in 1959, but no details were ever disclosed.)

The competing designs were rejected for being too heavy, while US Army engineers deemed that while the Redeye design was the most promising, it also needed further substantial studies on the IR seeker before development could begin. They also concluded that improvements on the IR seeker (and subsequent weight increase) were necessary for the system to perform as claimed on the proposal. Convair objected to the Army evaluation, stating that it already performed exhaustive research in private, while the United States Marine Corps were more enthusiastic about the Redeye and insisted that the weapon was ready for development, offering an initial funding of $1 million ($11.2 million in 2025) to accelerate the program.

On 14 April 1958, the development contract was released and Convair was awarded a contract to start development of the system.

=== Testing ===
The original design consisted of a simple tube with a clip-on grip system. The operator would simply point the tube in the general direction of the target, and fire when he heard the seeker make its "growl" sound, indicating it was locked onto the target. In May 1958 six unguided launches were conducted by US Marines at Twentynine Palms proving ground and Camp Pendleton, California, to assess human factors and ergonomics of the new weapon, as well as a trooper's capability to aim and launch a missile from the shoulder safely and accurately towards an imaginary target. In June 1958 the flight test phase of the feasibility demonstration program began.

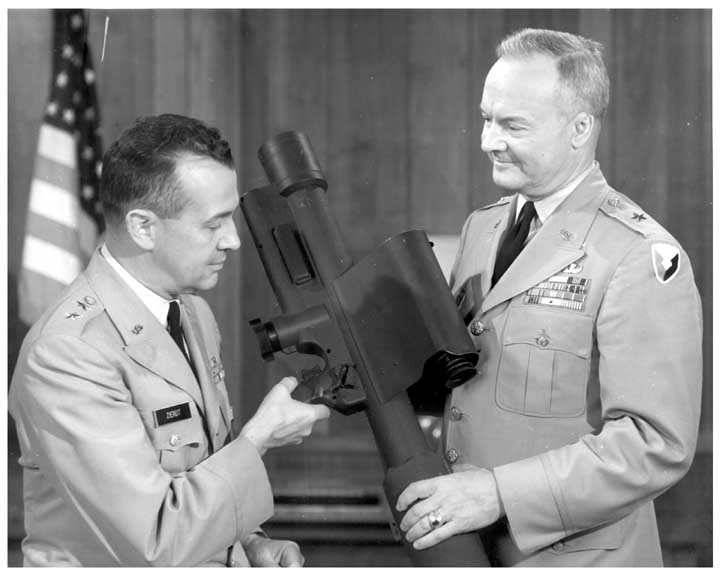
MICOM Commander General John G. Zierdt inspecting interim Redeye production model, disposable variant (note the optics and launcher design)

The first test launches were conducted with unguided missiles, while in March 1959 the first tests with guided missiles were conducted. After these tests proved that the basic concept was feasible, engineering development phase began in October 1960. Convair contracted the Philco Corporation and the Atlantic Research Corporation to work on the development of the seeker and the two-stage rocket motor respectively.

The US Army evaluation proved to be prescient: development was more difficult than expected, stretching to seven years, research costs tripled, and the Redeye weight increased from 18.2 lb (8.3 kg) to 29.3 lb (13.3 kg). Early testing also revealed technical problems with the propulsion system and pop-out tail fins. The uncooled lead-sulfide IR detector performance was also disappointing, with a 2−2.7μm sensitivity band it could only lock on the hot exhaust of jet aircraft, making the missile a tail-chaser only. After experimenting with thermoelectric cooling and a Hughes-designed gas-cooled seeker, the US Army eventually decided to eschew uncooled detectors in favor of a next-generation gas-cooled seeker, which gave the missile a limited ability to target other portions of the aircraft other than the tail. Another change introduced during development was turning the detachable grip stock and the launcher tube into a single piece. Once fired the single-piece launcher could be recycled and reloaded at the nearest supply depot up to eight times. Teething problems were gradually solved by 1963. During fiscal year 1963, 75 test launches were conducted against drones, with the first successful hit being made on 14 December 1962, against a QF-9F Panther jet drone flying at 275 knots (509 km/h; 316 mph). In October 1963, 13 missiles were fired, with 11 direct hits while the remaining two within 1 ft (0.30 m) from the thermal source. In light of these successes, the US Army was convinced to start the industrialization phase of the program.

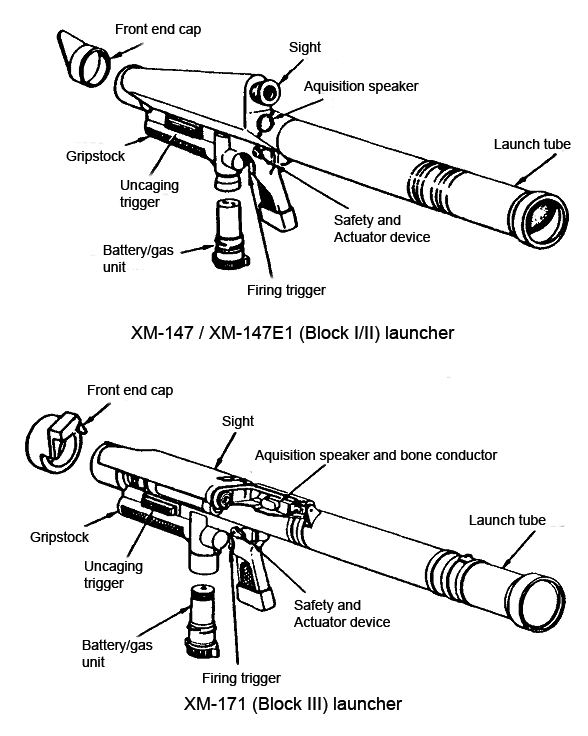
The block I/II launcher above, the block III launcher below

Limited production began in June 1963 as XM41 Redeye Block I. The missile was designated XMIM-43A and included the Mod 60 thermoelectrically cooled seeker. 300 systems were then evaluated between September 1965 and May 1966. After the Block I missiles were expended during engineering and service tests, the Block II systems designated XM41E1 came next, the improved missile being designated XMIM-43B and included a Mod 60A gas-cooled infrared detector cell. Deliveries of the missiles began in April 1966 alongside the final Block I missiles. In February 1967, the first Block II missiles were issued to US Army units for familiarization. A total of 1,743 XFIM-43B missiles were built for engineering tests and troop training.

The final Redeye Block III configuration, designated as the M41 Block III was a major redesign of the Redeye. The FIM-43C missiles retained the gas-cooled seeker from the Block II missile, but incorporated new components and electronics, including the new and improved M115 rocket motor, and M222 warhead. The new M171 launcher was fitted with a folding optical sight. The new missile could turn at up to 3g. The missile achieved a kill probability against F9F Panthers traveling at 490 mph (800 km/h) at an altitude of 330 ft (100 m) of 51%. From this it was calculated that the kill probability versus a Mikoyan-Gurevich MiG-21 at similar altitude would be 40.3%, and 53% against helicopters (specifically the Mil Mi-6 and US H-13 and H-21). Kill probability against larger propeller driven aircraft like the Antonov An-12 was estimated at 43%. Production of the Block III systems began in May 1967, with the first deliveries to the US Army and US Marine Corps starting in March 1968, but it was only cleared up for service in extreme climates in October 1968. On 18 December 1968, the M41 Block III was formally standardized as the FIM-43C, roughly six years behind schedule.

== Description ==
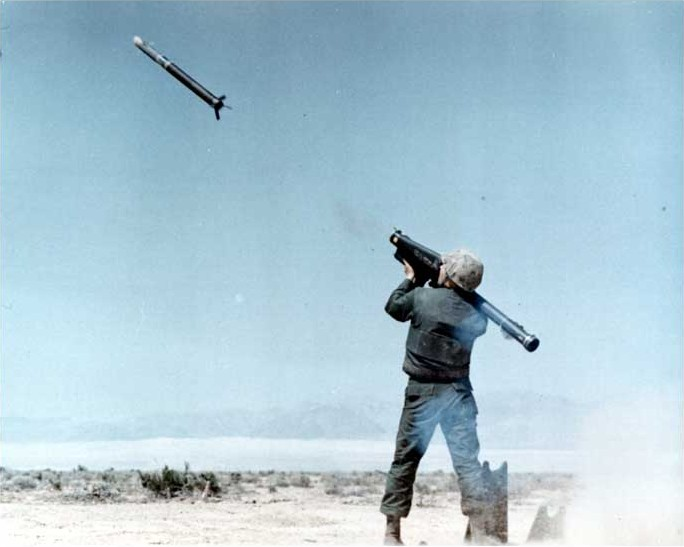
FIM-43C Redeye just after launch

The missile is fired from the M171 missile launcher. First, the seeker is cooled to operating temperature and then the operator begins to visually track the target using the sight unit on the launcher. Once the target is locked onto by the missile, a buzzer in the launcher hand grip begins vibrating, alerting the operator. The operator then presses the trigger, which fires the initial booster stage and launches the missile out of the tube at a speed of around 80 feet per second (25 m/s). As the missile leaves the tube, spring-loaded fins pop out—four stabilizing tail fins at the back of the missile, and two control surfaces at the front of the missile. Once the missile has traveled six meters, the sustainer motor ignites. The sustainer motor takes the missile to its peak velocity of Mach 1.7 in 5.8 seconds. The warhead is armed 1.2 seconds after the sustainer is ignited.

Early prototypes used an uncooled missile seeker which was capable only of acquiring and tracking the hot exhaust of aircraft, which limits the engagements to tail-chase only. The FIM-43C used a second-generation gas-cooled seeker which not only could lock on the rear aspect of enemy jets, but also other IR-emitting portions of the aircraft, giving it a limited ability of engaging from other angles. The FIM-43C seeker was sensitive enough to track propeller-driven light aircraft, but still remained most effective when fired at the rear of enemy jets. The probability to hit was estimated at 30% against high-performance, maneuvering jet aircraft and 50% against slower moving targets such as helicopters.

== Variants ==
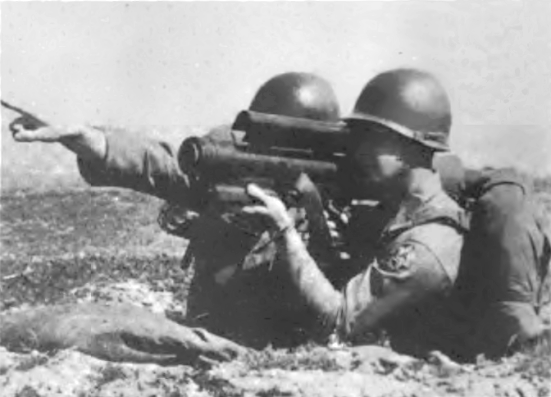
Test firing a prototype from a foxhole

- Block I FIM-43, XM-41 − Consisted of a XFIM-43A guided missile XM-147 launcher, and the XM-147 TRIPAK shipping and storage container. The missile was fitted with a Mod 60 Peltier device-cooled lead-sulfide (PbS) seeker. The thermoelectrical cooling was deemed inadequate against IR interference and dropped in favor of cryogenic cooling in subsequent variants.
- Block II FIM-43B, XM-41E1 – Improved version modified to increase performance and facilitate mass-production. The major components were the XFIM-43B guided missile, the XM-147E1 launcher and the XM-547E1 TRIPAK shipping and storage container. The missile was fitted with a Mod 60A gas-cooled seeker and improved warhead and fuse. The launcher was capable of firing XM-44E1 practice missiles.
- Block III FIM-43C, XM-41E2 – Production version; The XM-171 launcher, which used an open sight in place of the more expensive telescopic sight and new electronics to improve reliability and high volume production. The FIM-43C missile incorporated the Mod 60A gas-cooled seeker, a new M222 warhead, and the improved XM-115 rocket motor. The XM-571 MONOPAK shipping and storage container was lighter and less bulky than its predecessors, weighing in 44 lb (20 kg) empty and 76 lb (34 kg) loaded in comparison to the TRIPAK which weighted in 68 lb (31 kg) empty and 164 lb (74 kg). Each MONOPAK container carried the complete weapon plus three battery and coolant (Freon) units.
- Air Force RAM − In the late 1967, the United States Air Force launched the Redeye Air-launched Missile (RAM) program aimed at developing a system capable of tracking with accuracy maneuvering targets after being fired from maneuvering aircraft and with short-range capabilities included. Some modifications were made to allow the missile to be air-launched, including wiring the ejector and sustainer motors together for simultaneous ignition and lengthened tail fins to increase airframe stability. It was test fired from F-4 Phantom aircraft, but abandoned for budgetary reasons and restrictions found when launching the missiles at supersonic speeds.
- Helicopter RAM − Experimental air-to-surface missile designed to be mounted on helicopters. Like the Air Force RAM program, the missiles were adapted for air-launch by wiring the ejector and sustainer motors together. Other modifications included the installation of interfacing equipment between the helicopter and launching pods, and an improved lead selenide (PbSe) seeker. While tests demonstrated the feasibility of the system, the testing commission recommended against its use in the configuration evaluated and that further studies with a modified seeker were needed, but development was eventually abandoned.
- Navy Redeye − Experimental version intended for shipboard use. Modifications included a sight compatible with the United States Navy helmet and earphone set, and electromagnetic radiation shielding. While the program was successful, ultimately the Navy did not procure any missiles.

== Comparison chart ==
System	9K32M Strela-2M (missile: 9M32M)	9K34 Strela-3 (missile: 9M36)	FIM-43C Redeye
Service entry	1970	1974	1968
Weight of system ready to shoot	33 lb (15 kg)	35 lb (16 kg)	29 lb (13 kg)
Missile weight	20.2 lb (9.15 kg)	23 lb (10.3 kg)	18 lb (8.2 kg)
Length	59 in (1.5 m)	59 in (1.5 m)	49.7 in (1.26 m)
Warhead weight	2.6 lb (1.17 kg)	2.4 lb (1.1 kg)	4.4 lb (2 kg)
Warhead type	High-explosive fragmentation	High-explosive fragmentation	High-explosive fragmentation (M222)
Missile engagement aspect	Tail-chase only	Limited forward hemisphere (all-aspect) capability	Limited forward hemisphere (all-aspect) capability
Seeker type	Peltier-cooled; PbS detector element (1–2.8 μm sensitivity range).	Nitrogen-cooled; PbS detector element (3.5–5 μm sensitivity range).	Freon-cooled; PbS detector element
Engagement range	2,600–13,800 ft (800–4,200 m)	1,600–14,800 ft (500–4,500 m)	1,600–18,000 ft (500–5,500 m)
Missile speed	960 mph (1,550 km/h)	890 mph (1,440 km/h)	1,180 mph (Mach 1.6)
Engagement altitude	160–7,550 ft (50–2,300 m)	160–9,840 ft (50–3,000 m)	?−8,900 ft (2,700 m)
Source			

== History ==
Fifty Redeye systems were delivered to the mujahideen by the United States during the Soviet–Afghan War in 1984, where they were used to shoot down aircraft including several Sukhoi Su-25 jets, as well as Mil Mi-24 and Mi-8 helicopters. By November 1986 it had largely been replaced by the dramatically more successful FIM-92 Stinger missiles.

During the Guinea-Bissau War of Independence, Portugal repeatedly attempted to obtain Redeyes to bolster its defenses in Portuguese Guinea, but due the American arms embargo, these attempts ultimately failed.

All Redeye missiles were numbered and inventoried by the US Army Missile Command to prevent them from disappearance or otherwise unnoticed losses. No Redeye missiles were reported lost or stolen from the Army inventory, but losses occurred after Redeyes were supplied to foreign troops. This happened first in Belgium in January 1974, causing a strengthening of security measures in the major West European and British airports. In 1986, the FBI stopped an attempt by the Provisional Irish Republican Army to obtain Redeyes and other small arms via private jet from Boston; Several convictions followed the raid.

The Redeye was known as Hamlet in Danish service and as RBS 69 (Robot 69) in Swedish service. In West German service, the system was designated as the Fliegerfaust-1 or FLF-1

Redeye missiles provided to the FDN by the US were also used by the Nicaraguan "Contras" to shoot down at least four Soviet Mil Mi-8 helicopters during the Nicaraguan Revolution.

== Operators ==
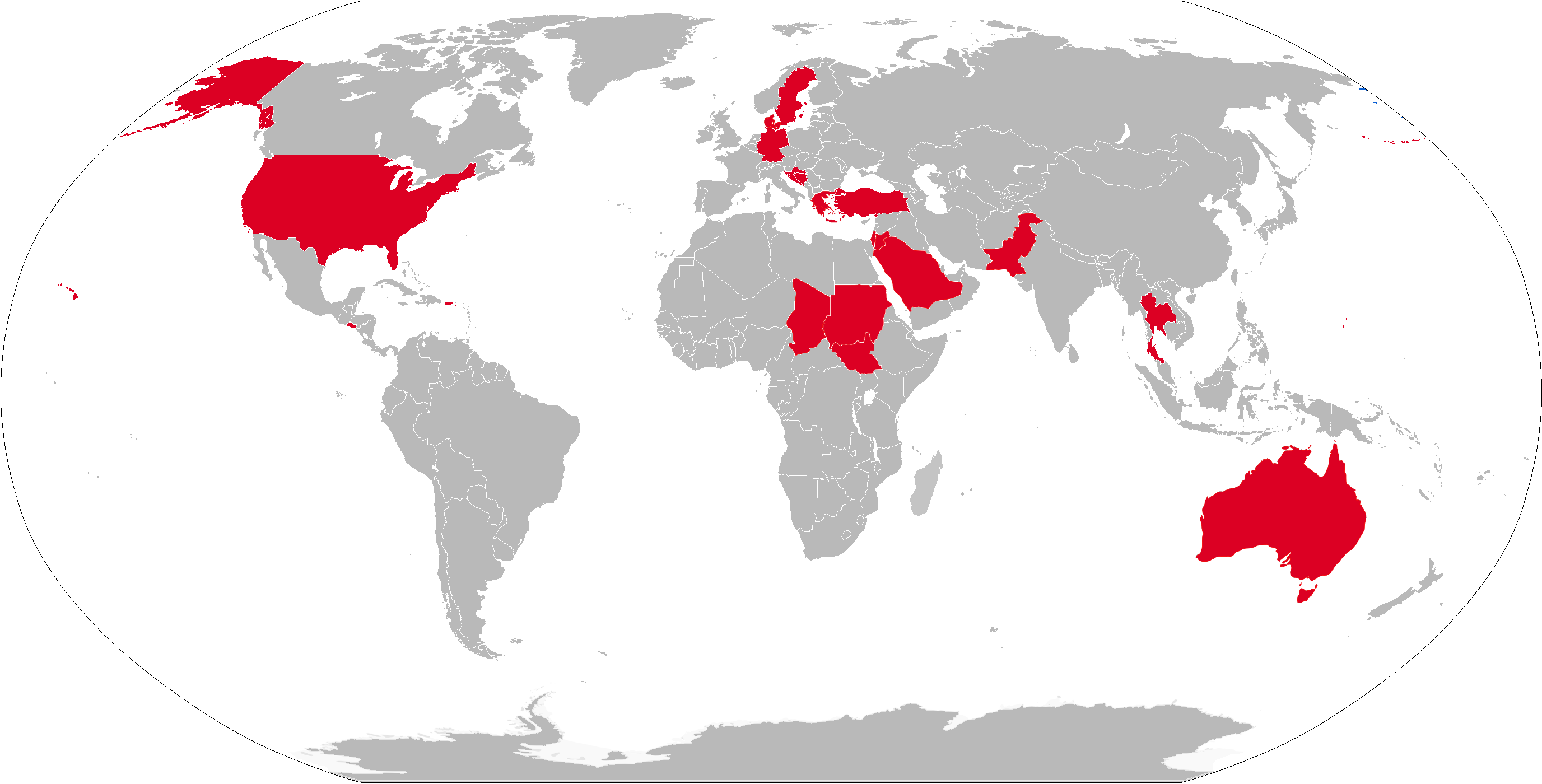
Map with former FIM-43 operators in red

=== Former ===
- Australia
- Chad
- Denmark − Improved propulsion FIM-43C designated as the Hamlet
- West Germany − Designated as the Fliegerfaust-1 (FLF-1)
- Greece
- Israel
- Jordan
- Pakistan
- Saudi Arabia
- Somalia
- Sudan
- Sweden − Designated as the Rb-69 (Robot-69)
- Thailand
- Turkey
- United States

=== Non-state former ===
- Afghan mujahideen
- (Chad) Armed Forces of the North (FAN)
- Contras
- Farabundo Martí National Liberation Front (FMLN)

=== Failed bids ===
- Portugal − Attempts to obtain FIM-43C missiles were blocked by an US arms embargo over the Portuguese Colonial War
- Provisional Irish Republican Army − An attempt to smuggle Redeyes from the US was foiled by the FBI in 1986

== See also ==
- List of U.S. Army rocket launchers by model number
- SA-7 Grail – (Soviet Union)
- Anza – (Pakistan)
- Misagh-2 – (Iran)
- Qaem – (Iran)
