= Vidhwansak =

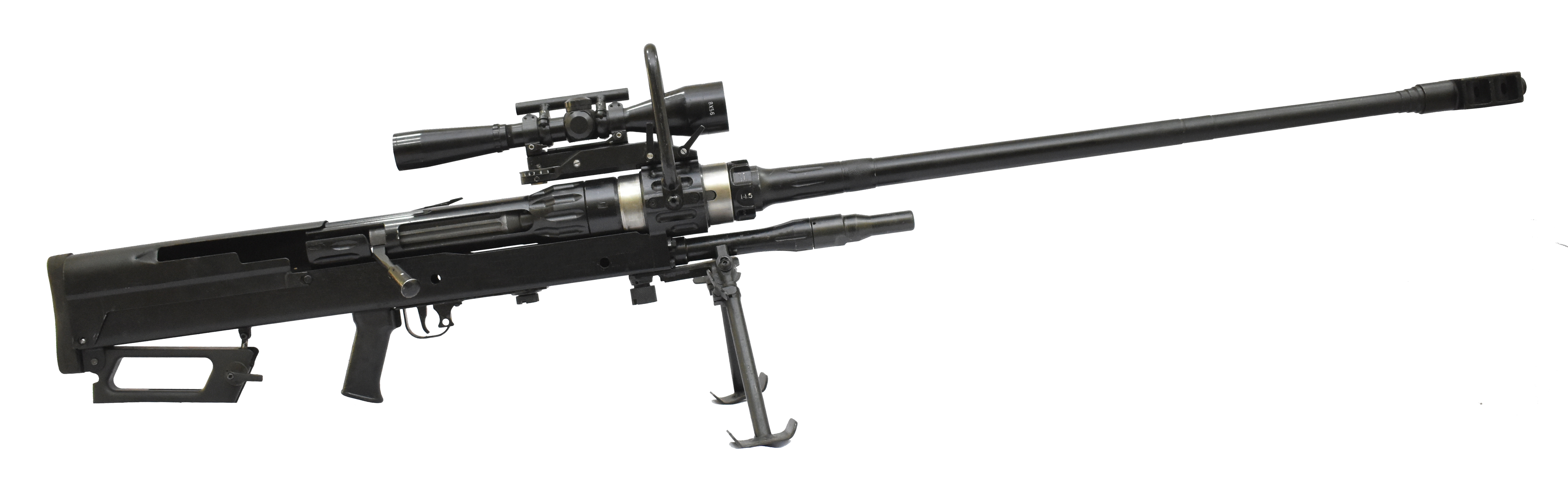
- Vidhwansak Anti Materiel Rifle (AMR)
- Type: Anti-material rifle
- Place of origin: India

Service history
- In service: 2007–present
- Used by: See Users

Production history
- Designer: Ordnance Factory Tiruchirappalli
- Designed: 2005
- Manufacturer: Ordnance Factory Tiruchirappalli
- Produced: February 2007

Specifications (14.5mm variant)
- Mass: 29 kg (64 lb)
- Length: 2 m (6 ft 7 in)
- Barrel length: 1.2 m (3 ft 11 in)
- Cartridge: 12.7×108mm, 14.5×114mm, 20x82mm
- Barrels: 8 Grooved, 1.1 m (3 ft 7 in) length, Quick Change type; 8 Grooved, 1.22 m (4 ft 0 in) Length, Quick Change type; Rifling: 1:390 mm (15 in), 1:420 mm (17 in), 1:560 mm (22 in)
- Action: Bolt Action, recoiling barrel
- Muzzle velocity: 845 m/s (2,770 ft/s), 1,080 m/s (3,500 ft/s), 720 m/s (2,400 ft/s)
- Effective firing range: 1,800 m (5,900 ft)
- Maximum firing range: 2,300 m (7,500 ft)
- Feed system: 3-round detachable box magazine
- Sights: 8×42 Power Telescopic sight with Parallax adjustment

Vidhwansak (Sanskrit: "Destroyer") is an Indian multi-caliber anti-materiel rifle (AMR) or large-caliber sniper rifle manufactured by Ordnance Factory Tiruchirappalli. It can be used in the anti-materiel role for destroying enemy bunkers, lightly armoured vehicles, radar systems, communication equipment, parked aircraft, fuel storage facilities, etc. It is also effective in long-range sniping, counter sniping, and ordnance disposal roles.

== Development ==
The Ordnance Factory Tiruchirapalli in association with the Defence Research and Development Organisation developed an anti-materiel rifle Vidhwansak in November 2005. It is almost an exact copy of the Denel NTW-20 rifle. After all-terrain and all-weather trials, the user trials began in March 2006. Production began in February 2007.

After trials, the Border Security Force ordered 100 Vidhwansaks for use in the border areas. These were supplied by October 2008. The rifle has also been offered to the Indian Army and the National Security Guards. However, the Indian Army chose not to bring the Vidhwansak into use as it did not meet the weight requirements.

It is being sold at the cost of Rs 10 lakh (about $20,000) as compared to the Denel NTW-20 AMR, which costs Rs 23 lakhs (about $45,000) as of 2011. Due to indigenisation of this weapon, foreign exchange worth over 90 million USD would be saved.

=== Features ===
Vidhwansak is a manually operated, rotating bolt-action rifle. The barrel along with the receiver recoil inside the chassis frame against a damping system. The rifle is fed from a detachable box magazine that is inserted from the left side. The rifle can be quickly disassembled and can be carried in two man-portable packs, each weighing about 12 to 15 kg (26 to 33 lb). A muzzle brake is fitted on the end of the barrel which absorbs an estimated 50–60% of recoil. This is further supplemented by a buffered slide in the receiver.

The Vidhwansak is equipped with an 8× magnification, long-eye-relief telescopic sight with parallax adjustment. A 12× ballistic scope can also be attached.

The rifle has an effective range of 1,800 m (5,900 ft) (1,300 m (4,300 ft) for the 20 mm version), while shots can be achieved even up to 2,000 m (6,600 ft). The rifle is magazine fed and reloaded through manual bolt action.

=== Variants ===
The Vidhwansak can be easily converted between the three calibers: 12.7 mm, 14.5 mm, and 20 mm, this is done by replacing the barrel, bolt, and magazine, which takes about one minute in the field, without the need for any specialized tools.

=== Specifications ===
The following are current specifications of the Vidhwansak AMR:

Ammunition	12.7×108mm	14.5×114mm	20×82mm
Weight	25 kg (55 lb)	29 kg (64 lb)	26 kg (57 lb)
Overall Length	1.7 m (5 ft 7 in)	2.015 m (6 ft 7.3 in)	1.795 m (5 ft 10.7 in)
Barrel	8 Grooved, 1.1 m (3 ft 7 in) length, Quick Change type	8 Grooved, 1.22 m (4 ft 0 in) Length, Quick Change type	8 Grooved, 1 m (3 ft 3 in) Length, Quick Change Type
Pitch of Rifle	1:390 mm (15 in)	1:420 mm (17 in)	1:560 mm (22 in)
Sights	8 × 42 power telescopic sight with parallax adjustment		
Muzzle Velocity	845 m/s (2,770 ft/s)	1,080 m/s (3,500 ft/s)	720 m/s (2,400 ft/s)
Range	1,800 m (5,900 ft)	2,300 m (7,500 ft)	1,300 m (4,300 ft)

== Users ==
- India:
  - Border Security Force (100) and Central Reserve Police Force. The Indo-Tibetan Border Police is seeking to acquire 450 Vidhwansaks for high-altitude operations.
- Denmark: Royal Danish Army - Used as a Test weapon by the Hærens kampskole (Army Combat and Fire Support Center) for testing Materials and protection, chambered in 14.5 x 114mm.

== See also ==
- Denel NTW-20 – (South Africa)
