= List of Danish military equipment of World War II =

The following is a list of Denmark military equipment of World War II which includes artillery, vehicles and vessels. World War II was a global war that was under way by 1939 and ended in 1945.

== Weapons ==
- List of World War II weapons of Denmark

== Aircraft ==
- List of aircraft of Denmark in World War II
