= 20×82mm =

20 mm ammunition cartridge

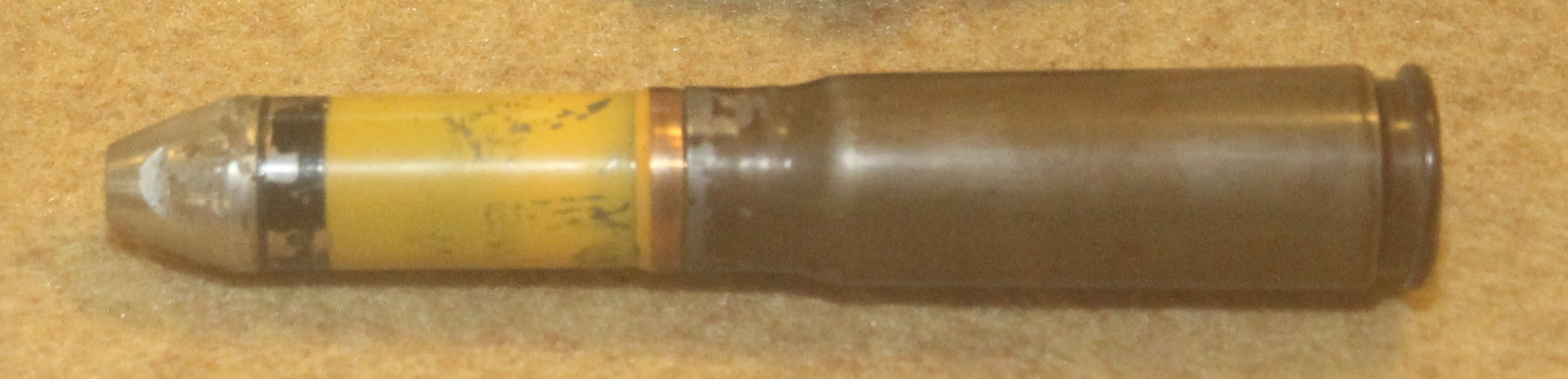
- 20×82mm
- Type: Autocannon cartridge
- Place of origin: Nazi Germany

Service history
- In service: 1941–1945 (Nazi Germany); 1962–today (South Africa
- Wars: World War II; Vietnam War; Portuguese Colonial War; South African Border War

Production history
- Designer: Mauser
- Designed: 1940
- Variants: 20×42mm

Specifications
- Case length: 82 mm (3.2 in)

The 20×82mm (sometimes 20×82mm Mauser) is a German 20 mm caliber cartridge developed during World War II for the MG 151/20 cannon. It continues to see usage today with the South-African Vektor GA-1 autocannon and Denel NTW-20 anti-material rifle and some remaining users of the MG 151/20.

== Usage ==
The cartridge was developed in Nazi Germany during World War II as a necked-up 20 mm variant of the 15×96mm cartridge in use with the MG 151/15 heavy aircraft machine gun. The 15 mm caliber proved to be insufficient for aircraft use and it was thus decided to redevelop the cartridge into 20 mm caliber, by shortening and necking up the casing, and installing the 20 mm mine shells of the MG FF/M. By necking up the existing cartridge, the MG 151/15 guns could easily be converted by a barrel switch, creating the MG 151/20.

Beyond the MG 151/20, the 20×82mm was also used in the MG 210 cannon, an attempt by Mauser to improve on the rate of fire of their MG 151 while making it lighter and simpler, as well as the French post-war MG 250 cannon by Atelier Mécanique de Mulhouse.

The 20×82mm cartridge went on to be produced postwar for countries who continued to use the MG 151/20 gun, especially France, who continued to use and sell the weapon into the 1960s as helicopter armament. One such venture, was the gunship model of the Aérospatiale Alouette III, which subsequently lead to its adoption by countries such as Portugal and South Africa. South Africa then went on to both produce and further develop the MG 151 as the Vektor GA-1, as well as the 20×82mm, later on adopting the cartridge for the Denel NTW-20 anti-material rifle in the 1990s. South Africa would later introduce a shorter belted variant in "20×42mm" for the Neopup PAW-20 grenade launcher.

== Cartridges ==
20 × 82 mm Mauser – ammunition table
German Designation	US Abbreviation	Projectile weight [g]	Bursting charge [g]	Muzzle velocity [m/s]	Notes
2 cm Sprenggranatpatrone 151 L'spur mit Zerleger	HEF-T	113–115; 115–117	3.7 g HE (PETN) + (blasting cap) : 0,6 g HE (PETN) + 0,28 - 0,4 g HE (Lead azide)-(Tetrazene explosive)	percussion: 705	Nose fuze, tracer, self-destruct.
2 cm Sprenggranatpatrone 151 L'spur mit Zerleger	HEF-T	113–115; 115–117	3.7 g HE (PETN) + (blasting cap) : 0,6 g HE (PETN) + 0,28 - 0,4 g HE (Lead azide)-(Tetrazene explosive)	electric primer: 720–735	Nose fuze, tracer, self-destruct.
2 cm Brandsprenggranatpatrone 151 L'spur/Gl'spur mit/ohne Zerleger	HEFI/-T	113–115; 115–117	2.3 g HE (PETN) + (blasting cap) : 0,6 g HE (PETN) + 0,28 - 0,4 g HE (Lead azide)-(Tetrazene explosive) + 2.1 g incendiary (Elektron)(Thermite)	percussion 705	Nose fuze, with or without tracer, with or without self-destruct.
2 cm Brandsprenggranatpatrone 151 L'spur/Gl'spur mit/ohne Zerleger	HEFI/-T	113–115; 115–117	2.3 g HE (PETN) + (blasting cap) : 0,6 g HE (PETN) + 0,28 - 0,4 g HE (Lead azide)-(Tetrazene explosive) + 2.1 g incendiary (Elektron)(Thermite)	electric primer 720–735	Nose fuze, with or without tracer, with or without self-destruct.
2 cm Brandgranatpatrone 151 L'Spur/Gl'spur mit/ohne Zerleger	I/-T	117–119	6.6 - 7.3 g incendiary (BaNO_{3}+Al+Mg) + (blasting cap) : 0,2 g HE (PETN) + 0,4 g HE (Lead azide)-(Tetrazene explosive)	pecussion 705	Nose fuze, w. or w/o tracer, w. or w/o self-destruct As soon as it hits the outer skin of the aircraft, the primer charge in the fuze head responds, shearing the fuze head away and igniting the incendiary charge in the projectile. The incendiary charge sprays forward over at least 10 m of projectile travel. In air combat as a carrier of the incendiary effect, especially for the incendiary shooting of fuel tanks. As an indestructible body, it remains effective even after penetrating several bulkheads. In combination with the M-Shell, it is intended to replace the HEI grenade.
2 cm Brandgranatpatrone 151 L'Spur/Gl'spur mit/ohne Zerleger	I/-T	117–119	6.6 - 7.3 g incendiary (BaNO_{3}+Al+Mg) + (blasting cap) : 0,2 g HE (PETN) + 0,4 g HE (Lead azide)-(Tetrazene explosive)	electric primer 720	
2 cm Brandgranat44 patrone 151 ohne Zerleger	I	106–108	6.2 g incendiary (Elektron)(Thermite) + (blasting cap) : 0,4 g HE (PETN)	?	Nose fuze, no tracer, no self-destruct. Incendiary effect due to ejection of the burning elektron shell.
2 cm Brandgranat44 patrone 151 El. ohne Zerleger	I	106–108	6.2 g incendiary (Elektron)(Thermite) + (blasting cap) : 0,4 g HE (PETN)	745	Nose fuze, no tracer, electric primer, no self-destruct. Incendiary effect due to ejection of the burning elektron shell.
2 cm Minengeschosspatrone 151 mit Zerleger	HEI-HC (M)	86–88	18.7 g HE (PETN) + (blasting cap) : 0,6 g HE (PETN) + 0,28 - 0,4 g HE (Lead azide)-(Tetrazene explosive)	805-810	Nose fuze, no tracer, self-destruct.
2 cm Minengeschosspatrone 151 ohne Zerleger	HEI-HC (M)	90–92	18.7 g HE (PETN) + (blasting cap) : 0,6 g HE (PETN) + 0,28 - 0,4 g HE (Lead azide)-(Tetrazene explosive)	805-810	Nose fuze, no tracer, no self-destruct.
2 cm Minengeschosspatrone 151 mit Zerleger	HEI-HC (M)	92–94	20 g HE (PETN) or 18.6 g HE (HA 41) + (blasting cap) : 0,29 - 0,4 g HE (PETN) + 0,2 g HE (Lead azide)-(Tetrazene explosive)	775-785	Nose fuze, no tracer, self-destruct.
2 cm Minengeschosspatrone 151 ohne Zerleger	HEI-HC (M)	95–97	20 g HE (PETN) or 18.6 g HE (HA 41) + (blasting cap) : 0,29 - 0,4 g HE (PETN) + 0,2 g HE (Lead azide)-(Tetrazene explosive)	755-765	Nose fuze, no tracer, no self-destruct.
2 cm Minengeschosspatrone X 151 mit Zerleger	HEI-HC (M)	104–106	24,5 - 25 g HE (HA 41) + (blasting cap) : 0,29 - 0,4 g HE (PETN) + 0,2 g HE (Lead azide)-(Tetrazene explosive)	705	Nose fuze, no tracer, self-destruct.
2 cm Minengeschosspatrone X 151 El. mit Zerleger	HEI-HC (M)	104–106	24,5 - 25 g HE (HA 41) + (blasting cap) : 0,29 - 0,4 g HE (PETN) + 0,2 g HE (Lead azide)-(Tetrazene explosive)	?	Nose fuze, no tracer, electric primer, self-destruct.
2 cm Minengeschosspatrone 151 El. mit Zerleger	HEI-HC (M)	92–94	20 g HE (PETN) or 18.6 g HE (HA 41) + (blasting cap) : 0,29 - 0,4 g HE (PETN) + 0,2 g HE (Lead azide)-(Tetrazene explosive)	780-790	Nose fuze, no tracer, electric primer, self-destruct.
2 cm Minengeschosspatrone 151 El. ohne Zerleger	HEI-HC (M)	95–97	20 g HE (PETN) or 18.6 g HE (HA 41) + (blasting cap) : 0,29 - 0,4 g HE (PETN) + 0,2 g HE (Lead azide)-(Tetrazene explosive)	770-780	Nose fuze, no tracer, electric primer, no self-destruct.
2 cm Panzergranatpatrone 151 L'spur ohne Zerleger	AP/-T	117–119	none (bakelite filling in cavity)	percussion: 705	Penetration 13-17-24 mm of armour at 60-75-90-degree impact, 100m range.
2 cm Panzergranatpatrone 151 L'spur ohne Zerleger	AP/-T	117–119	none (bakelite filling in cavity)	electric: 720	
2 cm Panzersprenggranatpatrone 151 mit/ohne Zerleger	APHEF	117–119	5.1 g HE (PETN) + (blasting cap) : 0,3 g (Lead azide) + 0,02 g (Lead styphnate)	705	Nose fuze, Penetration 13-15-17 mm of armour at 60-75-90-degree impact angle, 100 m range. Detonation after 5mm armour penetration.
2 cm Panzersprenggranatpatrone 151 El. mit/ohne Zerleger	APHEF	117–119	5.1 g HE (PETN) + (blasting cap) : 0,3 g (Lead azide) + 0,02 g (Lead styphnate)	720	Nose fuze, electric primer, w. or w/o self-destruct. Detonation after 5mm armour penetration.
2 cm Panzersprenggranatpatrone 151 L'spur/Gl'spur mit/ohne Zerleger	APHEF-T	117–119	? g HE (PETN) + (blasting cap) : 0,3 g (Lead azide) + 0,02 g (Lead styphnate)	705	Nose fuze, tracer, w. or w/o self-destruct. Penetration 13-15-17 mm of armour at 60-75-90-degree impact angle, 100 m range. Detonation after 5mm armour penetration.
2 cm Panzersprenggranatpatrone 151 L'spur/Gl'spur El. mit/ohne Zerleger	APHEF-T	117–119	? g HE (PETN) + (blasting cap) : 0,3 g (Lead azide) + 0,02 g (Lead styphnate)	720	Nose fuze, tracer, electric primer, w. or w/o self-destruct. Detonation after 5mm armour penetration.
2 cm Panzerbrandgranatpatrone (Phosphor) 151 L'spur/Gl'spur ohne Zerleger	API/-T	115–117	3.6 g incendiary (WP) + 8,6 - 9,1 g incendiary capsule	705	No fuze, w. or w/o tracer, no self-destruct. Penetration 6–12 mm to 13–23 mm of armour at 60 to 90-degree impact angle, 100 m range. When the projectile breaks up on sufficient impact, the phosphorus burns for a long time.
2 cm Panzerbrandgranatpatrone (Phosphor) 151 L'spur/Gl'spur El. ohne Zerleger	API/-T	115–117	3.6 g incendiary (WP) + 8,6 - 9,1 g incendiary capsule	720	w. or w/o tracer, electric primer, no self-destruct.
2 cm Panzerbrandgranatpatrone (Elektron) 151 ohne Zerleger	API	117–119	6.2 g incendiary (Elektron)(Thermite)	695	Optimized for strafing merchant ships and light combat vehicles. Nose fuze, no tracer, self-destruct. Penetration 15 mm of steel at 65-degree impact angle, 100 m range. Fuze functions after penetration of at least 4 mm shipbuilding steel, incendiary effect due to ejection of the burning elektron shell.
2 cm Panzerbrandgranatpatrone (Elektron) 151 El. ohne Zerleger	API	117–119	6.2 g incendiary (Elektron)(Thermite)	?	Optimized for strafing merchant ships and light combat vehicles. Nose fuze, no tracer, electric primer, self-destruct. . Fuze functions after penetration of at least 4 mm shipbuilding steel, incendiary effect due to ejection of the burning elektron shell.

== Guns in 20×82mm ==
- MG 151 cannon
- MG 210 cannon
- MG 250 cannon
- Vektor GA-1
- Denel NTW-20 (anti-material rifle)
