= MG 151 cannon =

WWII-era German aircraft autocannon

Maschinengewehr MG 151
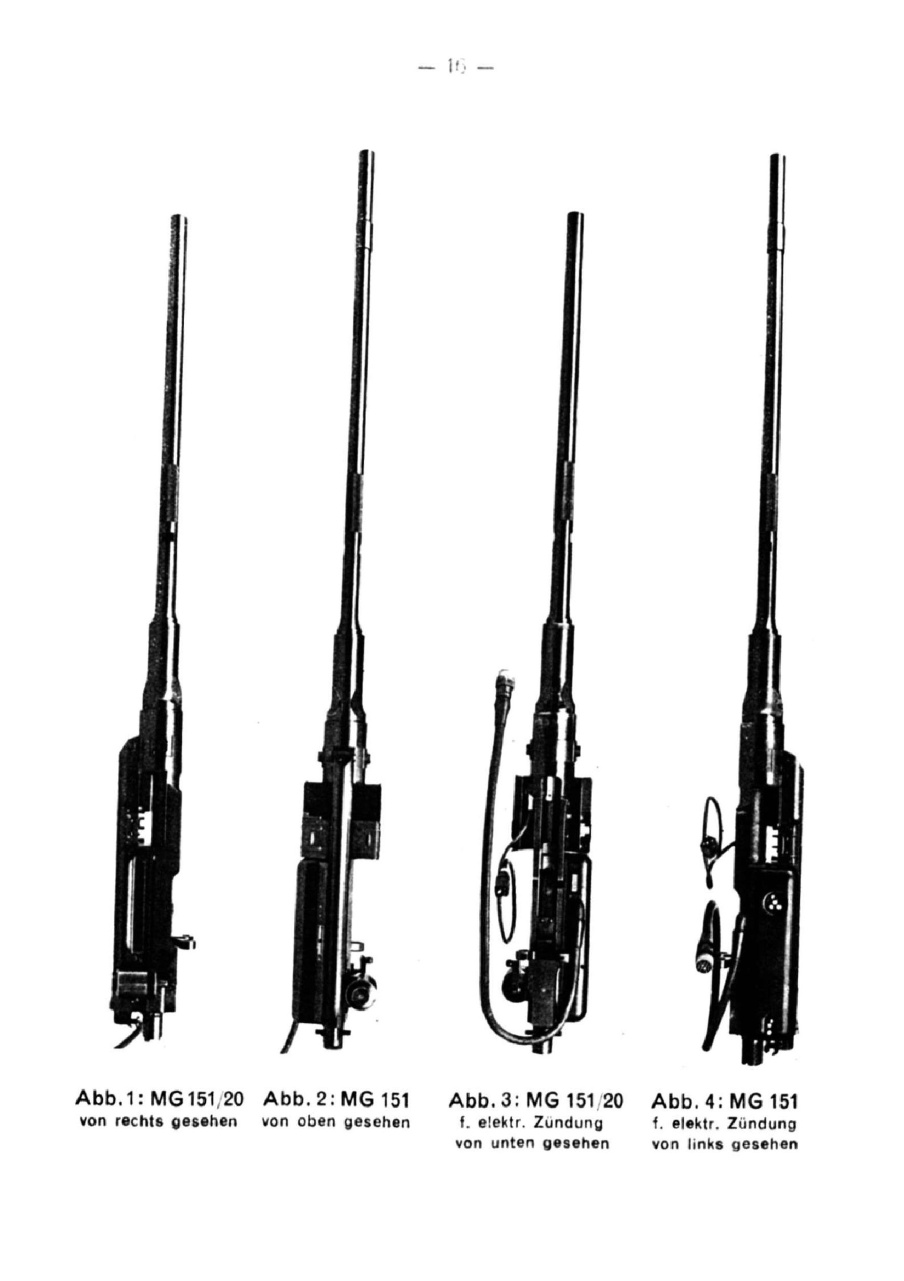
- MG 151/20 – normal (fig.1) vs. electric (fig.3) ignition MG 151/15 – normal (fig.2) vs. electric (fig.4) ignition
- Type: Aircraft cannon
- Place of origin: Germany

Service history
- Used by: See users
- Wars: See wars

Production history
- Manufacturer: Waffenfabrik Mauser AG
- Produced: 1940-1941 – MG 151/15; 1941-1945 – MG 151/20 (Nazi Germany)
- Variants: MG 151/15 (see specs); MG 151/20 (see specs)

The Maschinengewehr (MG) 151 is a belt-fed autocannon for aircraft use, developed in Nazi Germany from 1934 to 1940 and produced by Waffenfabrik Mauser during World War II. It was originally produced in 15.1 mm caliber from 1940, with a 15×96mm cartridge, but due to demand for higher effect against aircraft, especially with the introduction of mine shells for the 20 mm MG-FF/M aircraft cannon, the design was rechambered to 20 mm caliber in 1941, using a newly developed 20×82mm cartridge which traded muzzle velocity for explosive power. The initial 15 mm variant then became known as the MG 151/15, with the new 20 mm variant becoming the MG 151/20.

The MG 151/20 cannon was widely used on German Luftwaffe combat aircraft throughout World War II, mainly as offensive armament, but also seeing some use as defensive guns. Existing MG 151/15 guns saw use as aircraft armament throughout the war, albeit more limited compared to the MG 151/20, but also as anti-aircraft guns in various configurations, such as the SdKfz 251/21 Drilling half-track which carried three MG 151/15.

Post-war, salvaged MG 151/20 saw usage by many nations. France had salvaged many guns and became the main user and exporter of the MG 151/20 during the Cold War, fitting it to not only aircraft, but also armoured fighting vehicles as anti aircraft weaponry. France continued exporting the gun into the 1960s, then primarily as flexible door gunship armament for the Aérospatiale SA-3160 and SA-3164 Alouette III utility helicopter. SA-3160s armed with MG 151/20s were bought by Portugal, Rhodesia and South Africa in 1966 and saw service until the early 1990s. South Africa reused the 20×82mm cartridge from the MG 151/20 to chamber their Denel NTW-20 anti-materiel rifle.

== Development and wartime history ==
The pre-war German doctrine for arming single-engine fighter aircraft mirrored that of the French. This doctrine favoured a powerful autocannon mounted between the cylinder banks of a V engine and firing through the propeller hub, known as a moteur-canon in French (from its first use with the Hispano-Suiza HS.8C engine in World War I, on the SPAD S.XII) and by the cognate Motorkanone in German by the 1930s. The weapon preferred by the French in this role was the 20 mm Oerlikon FF S model, but this proved too big for German engines. Mauser was given the task of developing a gun that would fit, with a minimum sacrifice in performance. As a stop-gap measure, the MG FF cannon was developed from the Oerlikon FF and put in widespread use, but its performance was lackluster.

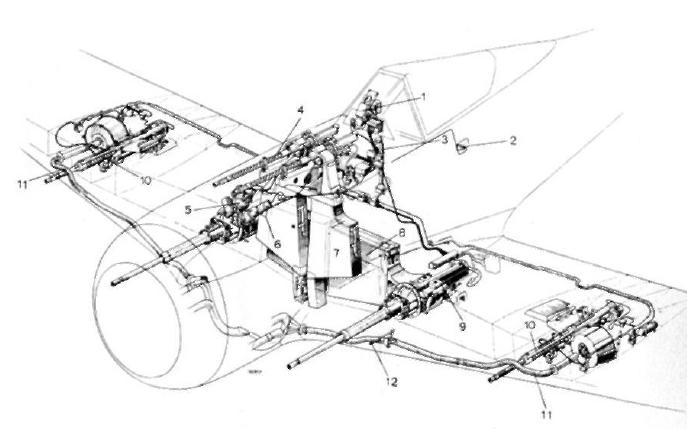
On the Focke-Wulf Fw 190A-5 interceptor two MG 151/20 were fitted in wing roots

Production of the MG 151 in its original 15 mm calibre format began in 1940. After combat evaluation of the 15 mm cartridge as the main armament of early Messerschmitt Bf 109F-2 fighters, the cannon was redesigned with a larger cartridge as the 20 mm MG 151/20 in 1941. Combat experience showed that a more powerful explosive shell was preferable to a higher projectile velocity. The MG 151/20 cartridge was created by expanding the neck of the MG 151/15 cartridge to hold the larger explosive shell used in the MG FF cannon, and shortening the length of the cartridge case to match the overall length of the original 15 mm cartridge. These measures simplified conversion of the 15 mm to the 20 mm MG 151/20, requiring only a change of barrel and other small modifications. A disadvantage of the simplified conversion was reduction of projectile muzzle velocity from 850 metres per second (2,800 ft/s) for the 15 mm shell to 700 m/s (2,300 ft/s) for the larger and heavier 20 mm shell. A 20 mm AP projectile could penetrate only 10–12 mm of armor at 300 m (at 60 degrees), compared to 18 mm penetration for the 15 mm under the same conditions but this was not seen as a significant limitation. The 20 mm version became the standard inboard cannon from the Bf 109F-4 series. The 20 mm MG 151/20 offered more predictable trajectory, longer range and higher impact velocity than the 580 m/s (1,900 ft/s) cartridge of the earlier MG FF cannon. The MG FF was retained for flexible, wing and upward firing Schräge Musik mounts to the end of the war.

The German preference for explosive power rather than armor penetration was taken further with the development of the mine shell which had been first introduced for the MG FF (in the Bf 109 E-4) and later for the MG 151/20. Even this improvement in explosive power turned out to be unsatisfactory against the four-engine bombers that German fighters were up against in the second part of the war. By German calculations, it took about 15–20 hits with the MG 151/20 to down a heavy bomber but this was reduced to just 3–4 hits for a 30 mm shell with the shattering effects of its hexogen explosive filling used by the long-barreled MK 103 and shorter barreled MK 108 cannon. Only four or five hits with 20 mm calibre cannon were needed for frontal attacks on heavy bombers (Boeing B-17 Flying Fortress and Consolidated B-24 Liberator) but such attacks were difficult to execute. The 30 mm MK 108 cannon thus replaced the MG 151/20 as the standard, engine-mount Motorkanone centre-line armament starting with the Bf 109 K-4 and was also retrofitted to some of the G-series.

Eight hundred MG 151/20 were exported to Japan aboard the Italian submarine Comandante Cappellini in August 1943 and used to equip 388 Japanese Kawasaki Ki-61-I Hien fighters. The 20 mm MG 151/20 was also fitted on the Macchi C.205, the Fiat G.55 and Reggiane Re.2005 of the Italian Regia Aeronautica and IAR 81B and 81C of the Romanian Royal Air Force.

An unknown number of cannons were converted for usage in the ground use role in early 1945, predominantly within Volkssturm units serving in the Posen area. Its effectiveness in this role is unknown but it was photographed on parade in Posen November 1944 with the Wartheland Volkssturm units.

=== Postwar use ===
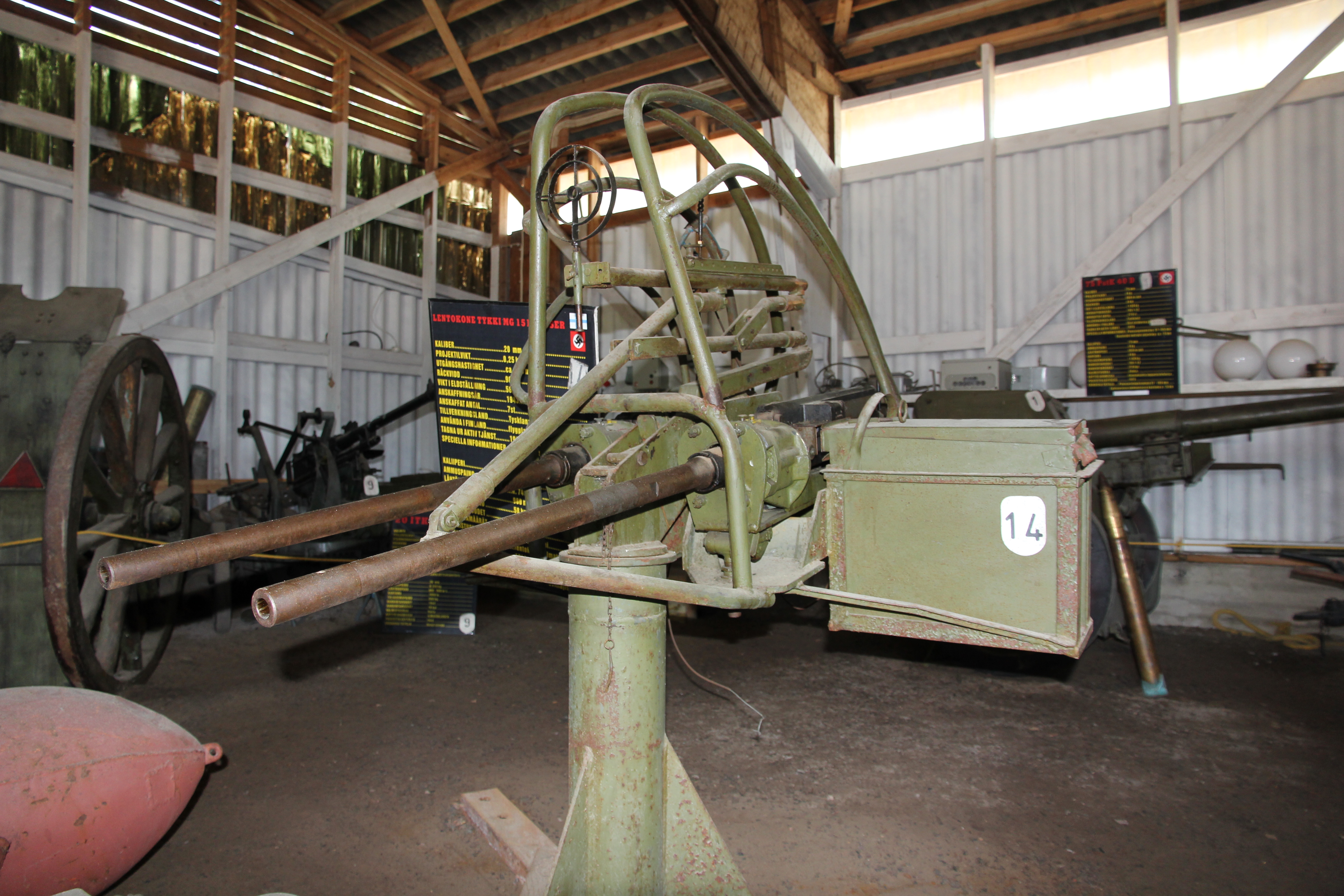
Two MG 151/20 cannon fitted to a Finnish TorKK MG-151 2 anti-aircraft mounting. Cannons of Torp museum (2011)

After World War II, numbers of ex-Luftwaffe MG 151/20 cannon were removed from inventory and from scrapped aircraft and used by various nations in their own aircraft. The French Armée de l'air (AdA) and French Army aviation arm (Aviation légère de l'armée de Terre, ALAT) used MG 151/20 cannon as fixed and flexible armament in various aircraft, including helicopters. The AdA and ALAT jointly developed a rubber-insulated flexible mount for the MG 151/20 for use as a door gun, which was later used in combat in Algeria aboard several FAF/ALAT Piasecki H-21C assault transport helicopters and on Sikorsky H-34 gunship helicopters. French Matra MG 151 20 mm cannons were used by Portugal and Rhodesia fitted to their Alouette III helicopters, while Denel designed its own variant for the South African Air Force.

== MG 151 applications ==
=== Aircraft ===
- (France) Bloch MB.175T
- (Nazi Germany) Dornier Do 17
- (Nazi Germany) Dornier Do 217
- (Italy) Fiat G.55 Centauro
- (Argentina) FMA IAe 33 Pulqui II (first prototype)
- (Nazi Germany) Focke-Wulf Fw 190
- (Nazi Germany) Focke-Wulf Ta 152
- (Nazi Germany) Heinkel He 162
- (Nazi Germany) Junkers Ju 87
- (Romania) IAR 79
- (Romania) IAR 80
- (Romania) IAR 81
- (Japan) Kawasaki Ki-61-I-Hei
- (Italy) Macchi C.205
- (Nazi Germany) Messerschmitt Bf 109
- (Nazi Germany) Messerschmitt Bf 110
- (Nazi Germany) Messerschmitt Me 163 Komet
- (Nazi Germany) Messerschmitt Me 210
- (Nazi Germany) Messerschmitt Me 410 Hornisse
- (Italy) Reggiane Re.2001 CN Falco II
- (Italy) Reggiane Re.2005 Sagittario
- (France) SNCASO SO.8000 Narval
- (Finland) Valmet MSv "Mörkö-Morane"

=== Armoured fighting vehicles ===
- (France) AMX-13t (SAMM S232 AA-turret)
- (France) AMX-50t (SAMM S36Z AA-gun mount)
- (France) FCM 12t (SAMM S232 AA-turret)
- (France) Lorraine 155 mm
- (Nazi Germany) SdKfz 251/21 Schützenpanzerwagen Drilling

=== Helicopters ===
- (France) Aérospatiale Alouette III SA-3160 – as gunships
- (France) Aérospatiale Alouette III SA-3164 – single prototype, also known as "Alouette-Canon"
- (France) Sikorsky H-34 Choctaw – as gunships
- (France) Sikorsky H-34A Pirate – gunship variant
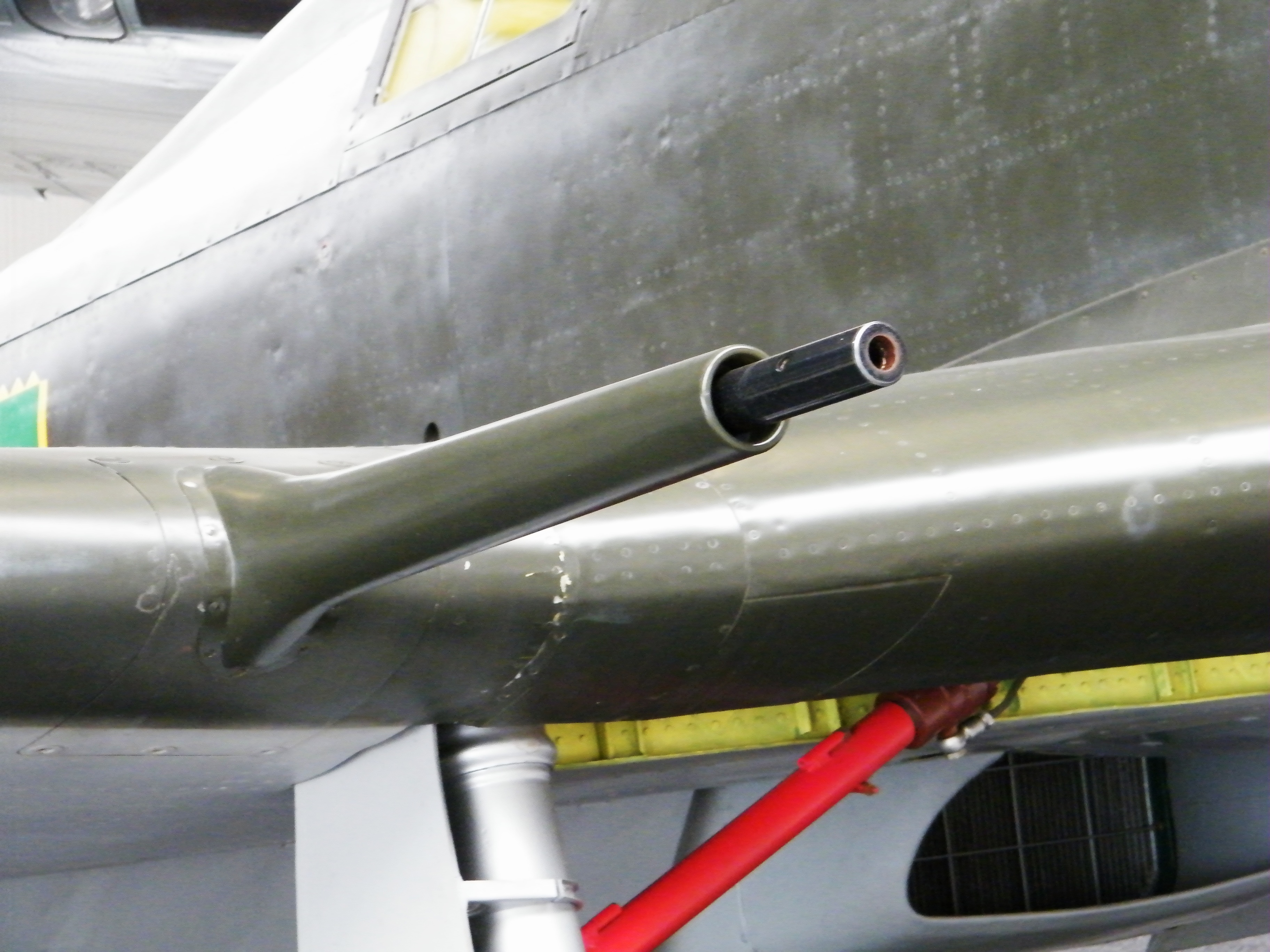
An MG 151/20 cannon in the wing of the Italian Fiat G.55 fighter

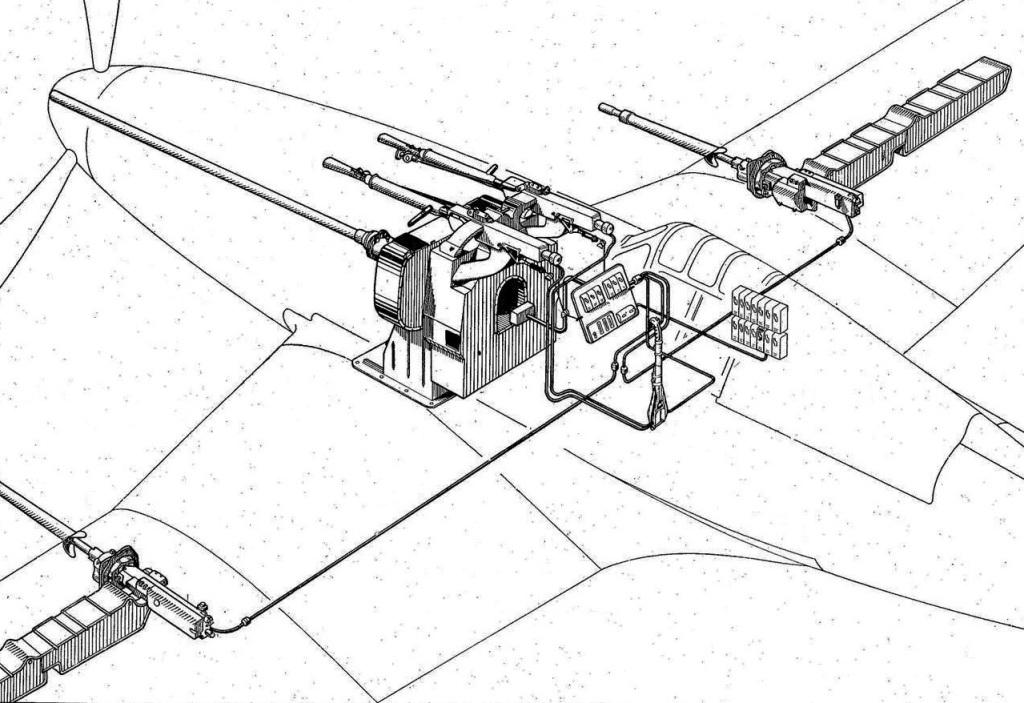
Fiat G.55 gun arrangement, with MG 151/20's as motor- and wing guns

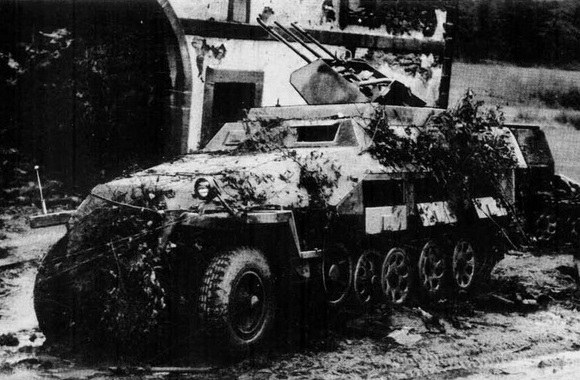
SdKfz 251/21 Drilling anti-aircraft half-track, armed with three MG 151/15

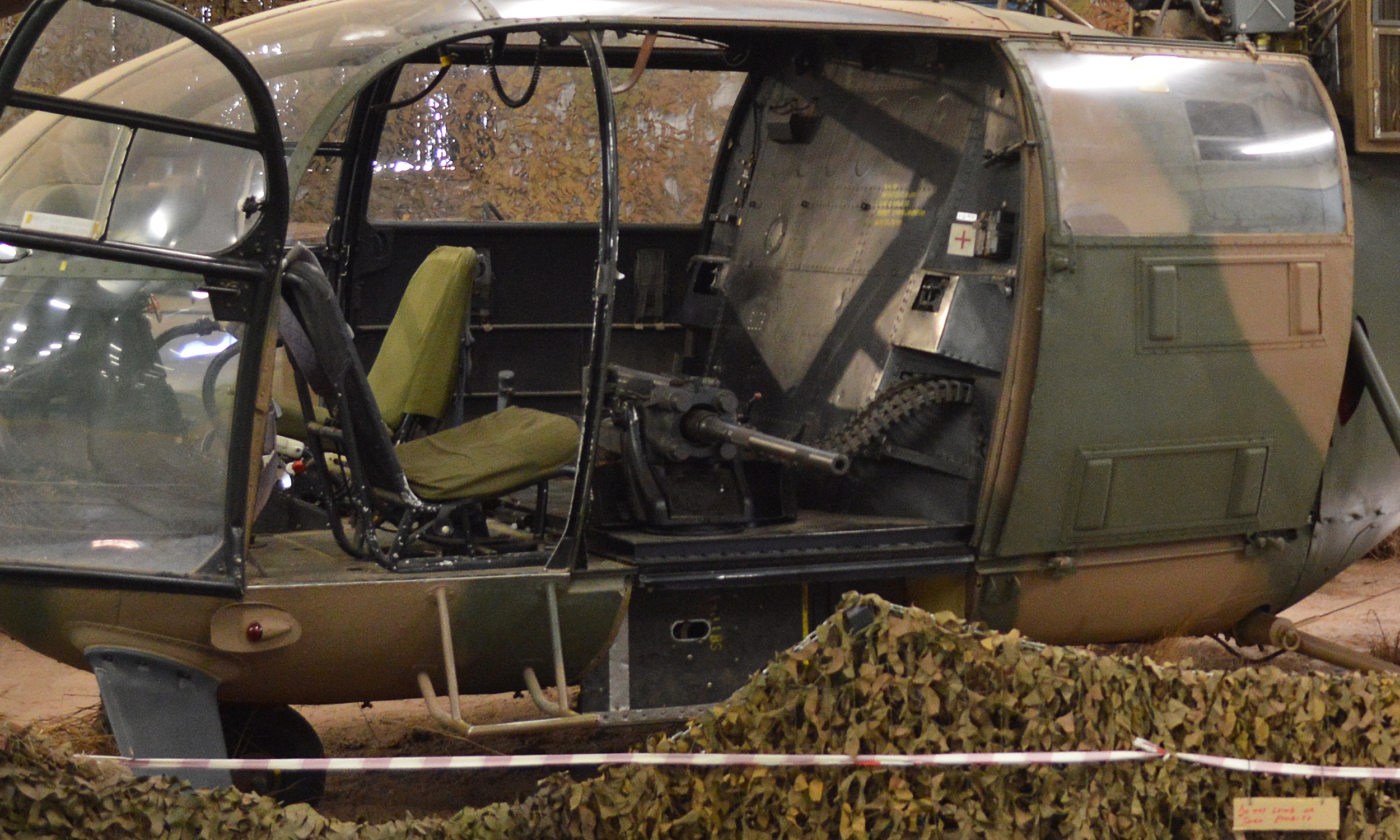
South African Aérospatiale SA-3160 Alouette III with flexible door MG 151/20

== MG 151/15 specifications ==
MG 151/15
- Type: Aircraft cannon
- Place of origin: Germany

Service history
- Used by: See users
- Wars: See wars

Production history
- Manufacturer: Waffenfabrik Mauser AG
- Produced: 1940-1941

Specifications (MG 151/15)
- Mass: 38.1 kg (84 lb 0 oz)
- Length: 1.916 m (6 ft 3.4 in)
- Barrel length: 1.254 m (4 ft 1.4 in)
- Shell: 15×96mm Mauser
- Caliber: 15.1 mm (0.59 in)
- Action: Short recoil, open-bolt
- Rate of fire: 680–740 rpm
- Muzzle velocity: 850 to 960 m/s (2,800 to 3,100 ft/s)
- Effective firing range: 1,000 m (3,300 ft)

- Barrel length: 1254 mm (L/83 caliber length)
- Rifling: 8 grooves, right hand twist, 1 turn in 16"
- Muzzle velocity:
  - 850 m/s (AP-T)
  - 960 m/s (HE-T, HEI-T)
  - 1030 m/s AP(WC)
- Projectile types:
  - AP-T weighing 72 g
  - HE weighing 57 g. HE filler: 2.8 g
  - AP(WC) weighing 52 g

== MG 151/20 specifications ==
Maschinengewehr MG 151/20
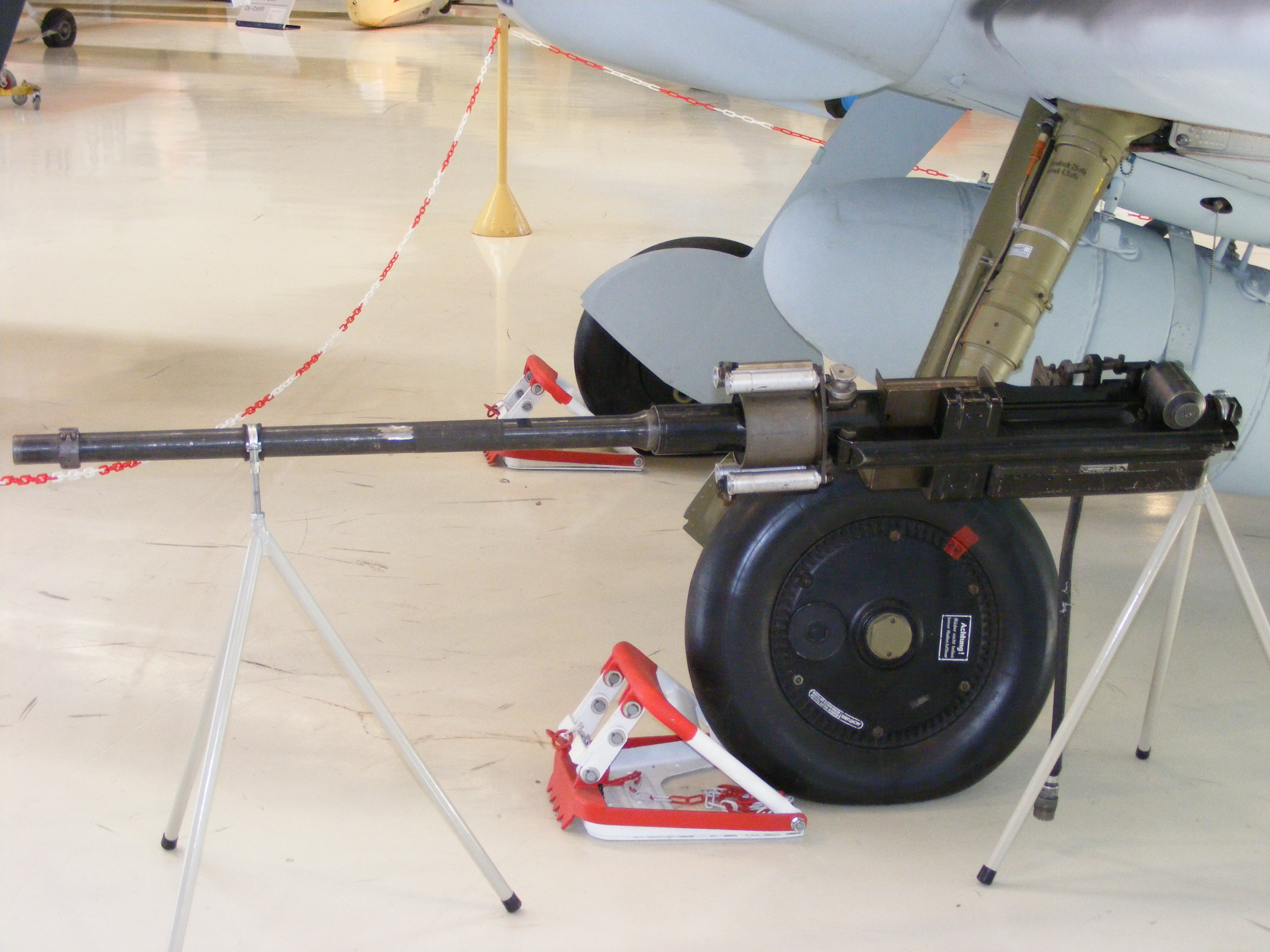
- Preserved MG 151/20.
- Type: Aircraft cannon
- Place of origin: Germany

Production history
- Manufacturer: Waffenfabrik Mauser AG
- Produced: 1941-1945

Specifications
- Mass: 42.7 kg (94 lb 2 oz)
- Length: 1.766 m (5 ft 9.5 in)
- Barrel length: 1.104 m (3 ft 7.5 in)
- Shell: 20×82mm Mauser
- Caliber: 20 mm (0.79 in)
- Action: Short recoil, open-bolt
- Rate of fire: 600–750 rpm
- Muzzle velocity: 705 to 805 m/s (2,310 to 2,640 ft/s)

Two versions of the 20 mm MG 151 were built. Early guns used a percussion priming system, and later E-models used electrical priming. Some rounds were available with a timer self-destruct and/or tracer (or glowtracer). There were also two different types of high-explosive shell fillings for the Mineshell with either standard Pentrit A which was pentaerythritol tetranitrate (PETN) and aluminium or HA 41 (RDX mixed with Aluminium powder which, when combined with delay detonators, had a 40% greater blast effect.

- Rifling: 1 turn in 23 calibers
- Effective range:800 m
- Muzzle velocity was 805 m/s (HEI-HC (M)) and 705 m/s (HE-Tracer, armor piercing)

Ammunition types (see 20×82mm):

- Tracer ammo
  - I-T – Incendiary, Tracer
  - API-T – Armour-Piercing Incendiary, Tracer
  - APHEF-T – Armour-Piercing High-Explosive Fragmentation, Tracer
  - HEF-T – High-Explosive Fragmentation, Tracer
  - HEFI-T – High-Explosive Fragmentation Incendiary, Tracer
  - AP-T – Armour-Piercing, Tracer
- Tracerless ammo
  - I – Incendiary
  - API – Armour-Piercing Incendiary
  - APHEF – Armour-Piercing High-Explosive Fragmentation
  - HEI-HC (M) – High-Explosive Incendiary, High Capacity

== US derivatives (T17, T39, T51) ==
During World War II, the US Army produced the 0.60-caliber T17, a reverse-engineered copy of the German MG 151 chambered for an experimental anti-tank rifle round. A speculative order of 5,000 T17 guns was placed, but only around 300 of them were built. However, none saw service despite the availability of 6 million rounds of .60 caliber ammunition. Almost one million rounds were fired during the T17 testing program. The main US version produced, the T17E3, was made by Frigidaire; it weighed 134 lb (61 kg) and had a rate of fire of only 600 rounds per minute. Further refinements led to the T39 and T51 versions, but these also did not enter service.

=== US ammunition ===
A cartridge originally based on an armor-piercing round designed in 1939 for use with the experimental T1 and T1E1 anti-tank rifles. It was cancelled in 1944 when it became clear that modern tanks had armor too thick to penetrate with a heavy rifle cartridge. Developments showed that shaped-charged rifle grenades and rocket launchers were the future of infantry anti-tank weapons, and the anti-tank rifle concept was abandoned.

Much like the British attempts to turn their stocks of obsolete .55 Boys anti-tank cartridges into a native-designed heavy machine gun cartridge, the .60-caliber cartridge was repurposed as an autocannon cartridge to succeed the older .50 Browning. The ammunition and the T17 cannon were produced from 1942 to 1946 but never proved a substantial improvement over the .50 Browning and the M2HB and M3 heavy machine guns. The cartridge was later shortened and necked up to produce the 20×102mm Vulcan autocannon round.

- .60 Armor-Piercing [15.2×114mm T1 Rifle] - A 1180-grain (76.5-gram) kinetic penetrator projectile with a velocity of 3,600 feet per second (1,100 m/s) for a muzzle energy of over 34,000 ft./lbs. (46 kilojoules).
- .60 T32 Ball [15.2×114mm T17 machine gun]
- .60 T77 Ball [15.2×114mm T17 machine gun]
- .60 T36 Incendiary [15.2×114mm T17 machine gun]
- .60 T39 Armor-Piercing Incendiary [15.2×114mm T17 machine gun]
- .60 T60 Armor-Piercing Incendiary [15.2×114mm T17 machine gun]

== Users (MG 151/20) ==
- Angola
- Finland
- France
- Germany
- Hungary
- Italian Social Republic
- Empire of Japan
- Portugal
- Rhodesia
- Romania
- South Africa

== Wars ==
- World War II
- Algerian War
- Portuguese Colonial War
- Rhodesian Bush War
- South African Border War

== See also ==
- List of weapons of military aircraft of Germany during World War II
- MK 108 30 mm cannon
- MG 131 13 mm heavy machine gun
- MG 17 7.92 mm machine gun
- Hispano-Suiza HS.404
- 20mm Type 99 cannon
