= 20 mm caliber =

Firearm caliber

20 mm caliber is a specific size of popular autocannon ammunition. The dividing line between smaller-caliber weapons, commonly called "guns", from larger-caliber "cannons" (e.g. machine gun vs. autocannon), is conventionally taken to be the 20 mm round, the smallest caliber of autocannon. All 20 mm cartridges have an outside projectile (bullet) diameter and barrel bore diameter of approximately 0.787 inches (20.0 mm). These projectiles are typically 75 to 127 mm (3–5 in) long, cartridge cases are typically 75 to 152 mm (3–6 in) long, and most are shells, with an explosive payload and detonating fuze.

Weapons using this caliber range from anti-materiel rifles and anti-tank rifles to aircraft autocannons and anti-aircraft guns.

== Usage ==
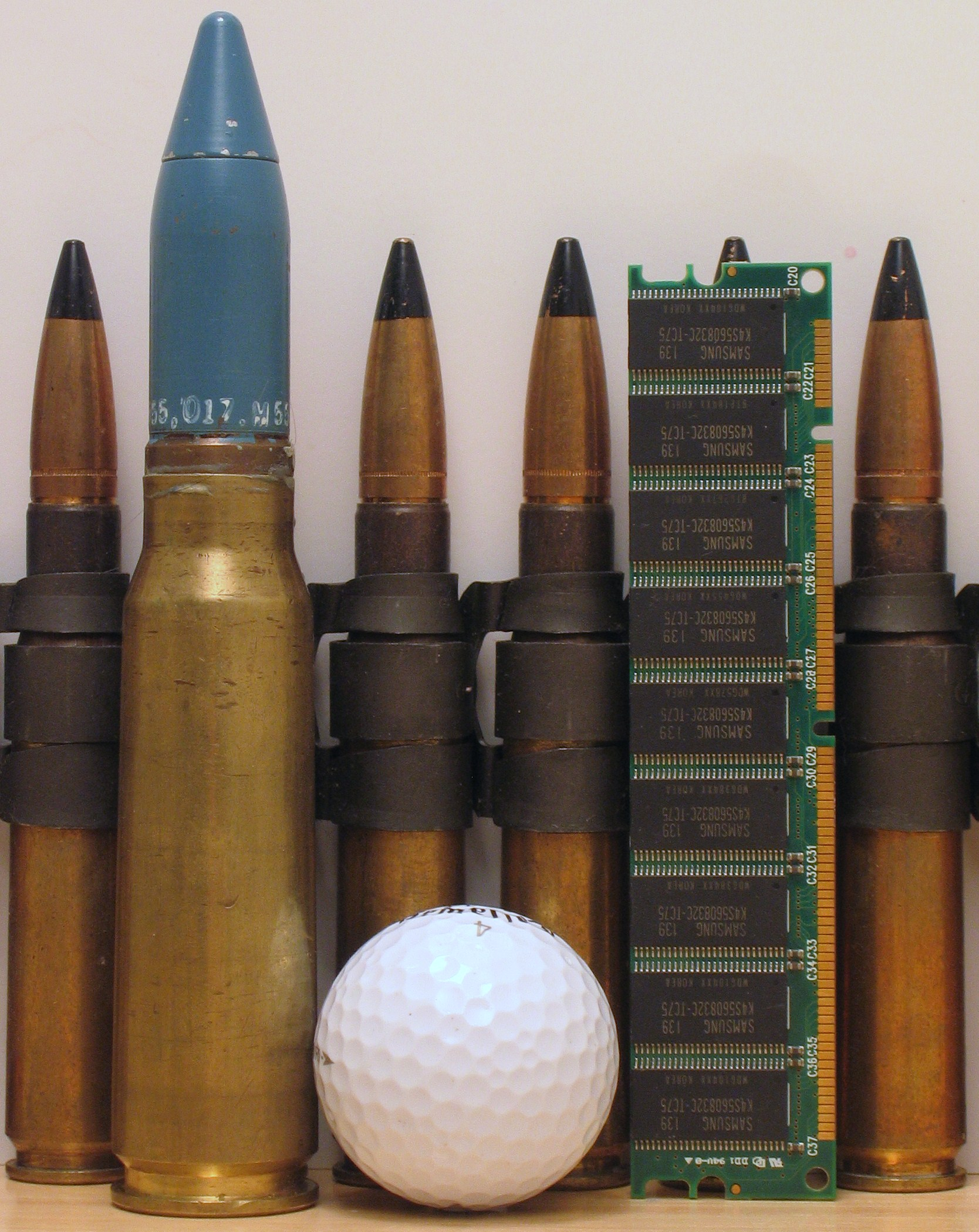
A 20×102mm round (second from left) with .50 BMG rounds, golf ball, and a stick of 168-pin SDRAM computer memory

Twenty millimeter caliber weapons are generally not used to target individual soldiers, but rather objects such as vehicles, buildings, or aircraft.

== Types of ammunition ==
- High explosive (HE)
- High explosive incendiary (HEI)
- Armor-piercing (AP)
- Semi-armor-piercing high explosive incendiary (SAPHEI)
- Armour-piercing discarding sabot (APDS)
- High explosive fragmentation tracer (HEF-T)
- High explosive high capacity (HE-M)
- Penetrator with enhanced lateral effect (PELE)
- Target practice - inert projectile (i.e., PGU-27A/B) Used for training (TP)
- Target practice tracer - inert projectile with tracer material in base for visual trajectory tracking (i.e., PGU-30A/B) (TP-T)

== 20 mm weapons ==
Each weapon is listed with its cartridge type appended.

=== Current weapons ===
Weapon	Country of origin	Cartridge	Notes
Neopup PAW-20	South Africa	20×42mm	
Denel NTW-20	South Africa	20×82mm Mauser	
Denel Vektor GA-1	South Africa	20×82mm Mauser	
Vidhwansak	India	20×82mm Mauser	
Anzio 20mm rifle	United States	20×102mm	
Arash anti-materiel rifle	Iran	20×102mm	
M61 Vulcan	United States	20×102mm	
M197 electric cannon	United States	20×102mm	
M39 cannon	United States	20×102mm	
GIAT M621	France	20×102mm	
ZVI PL-20 Plamen	Czech Republic	20×102mm	
Nexter Narwhal 20A	France	20×102mm	Based on the M621
Şahi 20-102	Turkey	20×102mm	
XM301	United States	20×102mm	
Denel NTW-20	South Africa	20×110mm Hispano	
Metallic RT-20	Croatia	20×110mm Hispano	
Truvelo CMS 20x110mm	South Africa	20×110mm Hispano	
Yugoimport-SDPR M71/08	Serbia	20×110mm Hispano	Single barrel development of Zastava M55
Oerlikon KAE (KAA/KAB)	Switzerland	20×128mm	Formerly known as Oerlikon 204GK/5TG
Meroka CIWS	Spain	20×128mm	
Escribano SENTINEL 20	Spain	20×128mm	RWS
Oerlikon KAD	Switzerland	20×139mm	Formerly known as Hispano-Suiza HS.820
GIAT M693/20 mm modèle F2	France	20×139mm	
Rheinmetall Rh 202	Germany	20×139mm	
Denel Land Systems GI-2	South Africa	20×139mm	
Nexter Narwhal 20B	France	20×139mm	Based on the 20 mm F2

=== Historical weapons ===
Weapon	Country of origin	Cartridge	Notes
Becker Type M2 20 mm cannon	German Empire	20×70mmRB	
Oerlikon FF	Switzerland	20×72mmRB	
Type 99 cannon, model 1	Japan	20×72mmRB	
Ikaria-Werke Berlin MG FF/M cannon	Nazi Germany	20×80mmRB	
Mauser MG 151/20	Nazi Germany	20×82mm	
Ho-5 cannon	Japanese Empire	20×94mm	
Berezin B-20	Soviet Union	20×99mmR	
ShVAK	Soviet Union	20×99mmR	
Helenius RK-20 APH	Finland	20×99mmR	Derivative of the Helenius RK-97 12.7 mm anti-materiel rifle
Ghan-Krnka fortress rifle	Russian Empire	20.3×95mmR	Bullet diameter 21 mm
Type 99 cannon, model 2	Japanese Empire	20×101mmRB	
Solothurn S-18/100	Switzerland	20×105mmB	
Automatkanon m/45	Sweden	20×110mm	Aircraft autocannon
Automatkanon m/49	Sweden	20×110mm	Aircraft autocannon
Hispano-Suiza HS.404 and derivatives	Switzerland	20×110mm	
Oerlikon F, FFL	Switzerland	20×110mmRB	
Polsten	Poland	20×110mmRB	
Colt Mk 12 cannon	United States	20×110mm USN	Advanced derivative of the HS.404
Madsen 20 mm anti-aircraft cannon	Denmark	20×120mm	
Type 97 automatic cannon	Japanese Empire	20×124mm	
Mauser MG 213	Nazi Germany	20×135mm	
Solothurn S-18/1000 anti-tank rifle	Switzerland	20×138mmB	
Solothurn S-18/1100 anti-tank rifle	Switzerland	20×138mmB	
ST-5 20 mm AA gun	Switzerland	20×138mmB	
FlaK 30 and FlaK 38 single-barrel AA	Nazi Germany	20×138mmB	Forerunner of Hispano-Suiza HS.820's post-war 20×139mm round
Flakvierling quadruple-barrel AA	Nazi Germany	20×138mmB	
MG C/30L aircraft gun	Nazi Germany	20×138mmB	
Rheinmetall KwK 30 and KwK 38	Nazi Germany	20×138mmB	
Cannone-Mitragliera da 20/65 modello 35 (Breda)	Kingdom of Italy	20×138mmB	
Cannone-Mitragliera da 20/77 (Scotti)	Kingdom of Italy	20×138mmB	
Lahti L-39 anti-tank rifle	Finland	20×138mmB	Solothurn Long
Lahti L-40 anti-aircraft gun	Finland	20×138mmB	
Nkm wz.38 FK anti-tank vehicle-mounted gun	Poland	20×138mmB	Designated "heaviest machine gun", or "Najcięższy karabin maszynowy, Nkm", AA/AT (actually an autocannon)
Type 98 20 mm AA machine cannon and Type 4 20 mm twin AA machine cannon	Japan	20×142mm	
Automatkanon m/40	Sweden	20×145mmR	Autocannon
Pansarvärnsgevär m/42	Sweden	20×180mmR	Recoilless anti-tank rifle

== Cartridges ==
(incomplete list)

Dimensions	Name	Date	Bullet diameter	Case length	Rim	Base	Shoulder	Neck	Cartridge length
20.3×95R Ghan		21 (.827)	95 (3.74)	-	-	-	-	-	
20×150R		~21 (~.827)	150 (5.9)	-	-	-	-	-	

== Naming conventions ==
The usual nomenclature of ammunition indicates the diameter of projectile and the length of the cartridge that holds it; for example, 20×102mm is a 20 mm projectile in a 102 mm long case.

Though this designation is often assumed to be unique, this is not always the case, e.g. there are three different 20×110mm types which are not compatible. These may be distinguished in that some cartridge designations may include additional letters or names as a suffix, e.g. the various different types of 20×110mm might be distinguished as 20×110mm Hispano, 20×110mmRB and 20×110mm USN.

=== Common suffixes ===
- B e.g. 20×138B: the cartridge has a belt which is used for headspacing, i.e. it helps ensure the correct positioning within the gun's chamber.
- R e.g. 20×145R: a rimmed cartridge: the diameter of the rim forming the base is larger than that of the cartridge case itself.
- RB e.g. Oerlikon 20×110RB: rebated rim, one where the rim is a smaller diameter than the case head allowing the extractor to follow it into the chamber, facilitating advanced-primer ignition, a recoil-moderating system.
