= Denel NTW-20 =

South African anti-material rifle

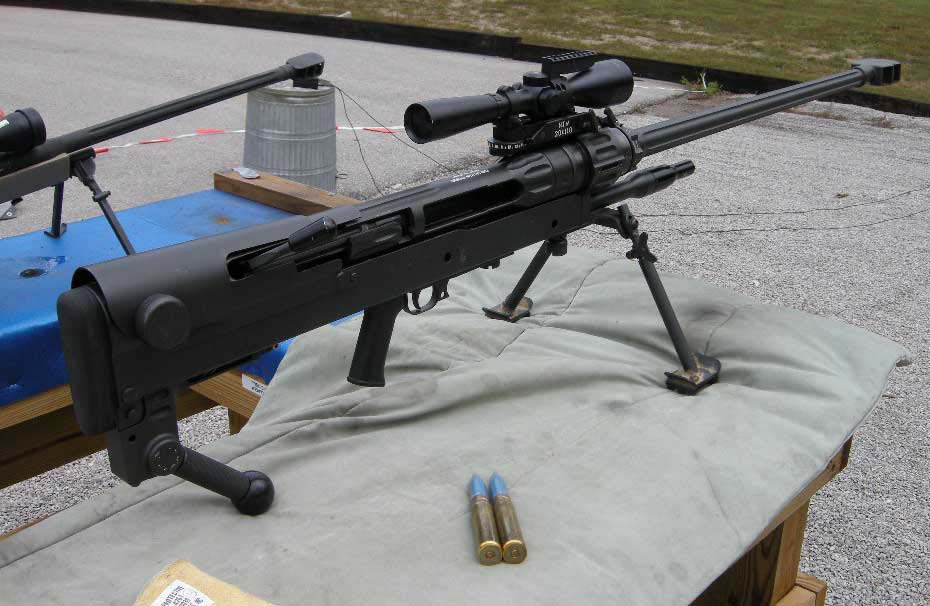
- A Denel NTW-20 on display
- Type: Anti-materiel rifle
- Place of origin: South Africa

Service history
- In service: 1998–present

Production history
- Designer: Tony Neophytou
- Designed: 1995
- Manufacturer: Denel Land Systems
- Variants: NTW 20, NTW 14.5, NTW 20×110mm

Specifications
- Mass: 31 kg (NTW 20), 34 kg (NTW 14.5)
- Length: 1,795 mm (NTW 20), 2,015 mm (NTW 14.5)
- Barrel length: 1,000 mm (NTW 20), 1,220 mm (NTW 14.5)
- Crew: Two; rifle breaks down into two parts for transport and fits into two backpacks weighing 15kg each, one containing the weapon receiver section, while the other contains the barrel and ammunition
- Cartridge: 20×82mm (NTW 20); 20×110mm Hispano (NTW 20×110mm); 14.5×114mm (NTW 14.5)
- Action: Bolt action, recoiling barrel
- Muzzle velocity: 720 m/s (20×82mm); 820 m/s (20×110mm); 1,000 m/s (14.5×114mm)
- Effective firing range: 1,500m (20×82mm); 1,800m (20×110mm); 2,300m (14.5×114mm)
- Feed system: 3-round detachable box magazine (20×82mm and 14.5×114mm); Single shot (20×110mm)
- Sights: 8 × 56 Lynx Telescopic sight

The NTW-20 is an anti-materiel rifle, developed in South Africa by Denel Mechem in the mid 1990s. It is intended for deployment against targets including parked aircraft, telecommunication masts, power lines, missile sites, radar installations, refineries, satellite dishes, gun emplacements, bunkers, and personnel, using a range of specialised projectiles.

== Development ==
The weapon was designed by Tony Neophytou (co-designer of the Neostead combat shotgun). Development of the system began in August 1995 under the "Aerotek" name and a working prototype was ready for testing four and a half months later. This rapid progress was made possible by Neophytou's expertise in the field of recoil reduction systems, having worked on helicopter turrets in the past. To further reduce the amount of research and development, the project recycled the barrel, bolt and barrel extension of the existing Vektor GA1 automatic cannon. It was put into production by Denel Land Systems in two versions; 20×110mm HS and 20×82mm. The latter model is also available in 14.5×114 mm and conversion between the calibres can be done in the field by swapping the barrel and bolt assembly. The significantly larger 20×110mm model cannot be converted to another calibre. The rifle was accepted into service with the South African National Defence Force in 1998.

== Features ==
Switching between the two calibres of the NTW (20×82mm and 14.5×114mm) requires changing the bolt, barrel, sighting gear and magazine. A third variant, the NTW 20×110mm has been developed, but is not designed for calibre switching. Caliber switching the NTW 20/14.5 can be accomplished in the field without specialised tools. The magazine protrudes from the left side of the receiver. The NTW can be disassembled and packed into two backpacks for carriage. A muzzle brake is fitted on the end of the barrel which absorbs an estimated 50%–60% of recoil. This is further supplemented by a buffered slide in the receiver.

== Variants ==
	20×82mm	14.5×114mm	20×110mm
Cartridge	20×82mm	14.5×114mm	20×110mm Hispano-Suiza
Weight (empty)	30.0 kg (66.1 lb)	34.0 kg (75.0 lb)	32.0 kg (70.5 lb)
Overall length	1,800 mm (71 in)	2,016 mm (79.4 in)	1,800 mm (71 in)
Rifling (1 full turn)	560 mm (22 in)	408 mm (16.1 in)	
Length of barrel	1,000 mm (39 in)	1,220 mm (48 in)	1,000 mm (39 in)
Muzzle velocity	720 m/s (2,400 ft/s)	1,000 m/s (3,300 ft/s)	820 m/s (2,700 ft/s)
Muzzle energy	28,000 J (21,000 ft⋅lbf)	32,000 J (24,000 ft⋅lbf)	42,000 J (31,000 ft⋅lbf)
Effective range	> 1,600 m (1,700 yd)	> 2,400 m (2,600 yd)	> 1,800 m (2,000 yd)

== Influence ==
Denel Land Systems was contracted to supply weapon systems for the Indian Armed Forces, including anti-materiel rifles and self-propelled howitzers. However, following allegations that it had paid kickbacks to secure a deal for anti-materiel rifles, Denel was blacklisted by the Indian government. Subsequently, the Ordnance Factory Tiruchirappalli (OFT) developed an indigenous anti-material rifle called Vidhwansak, which borrowed heavily from the Denel NTW-20. The development of Vidhwansak was completed in November 2005. The embargo against Denel was lifted in 2018 after investigations found the allegations to have been false.

When it became known in August 2013 that a South African Special Forces officer had used this weapon to make what was then the sixth longest recorded sniper kill at 2,125 m (2,324 yd), it generated a lot of popular and media interest.

== Users ==
- Azerbaijan: Used by Azerbaijani Land Forces.
- India: Used by the Indian Army.
- Indonesia: Used by Taifib (Marine Amphibious Reconnaissance Battalion) of the Indonesian Navy; and Kopasgat (Quick Reaction Forces Command) of the Indonesian Air Force.
- Malaysia: Used by Malaysian Army.
- South Africa: Used by South African Special Forces and the South African Army.

== See also ==
- RT-20 (rifle) – (Croatia)
- Truvelo Armoury
- Vidhwansak – (India)
- Longest recorded sniper kills

== Bibliography ==
- Kokalis, Peter (2001). Weapons Tests And Evaluations: The Best Of Soldier Of Fortune. Boulder, CO: Paladin Press. ISBN 978-1-58160-122-0.
