= RT-20 (rifle) =

Bullpup anti-materiel precision rifle

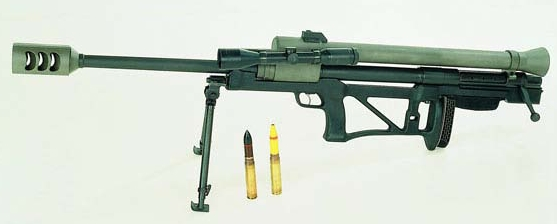
- A bipod-mounted RT-20
- Type: Bullpup anti-materiel rifle
- Place of origin: Croatia

Service history
- In service: 1993–present
- Used by: See Users

Specifications
- Mass: 19.8 kg (43.7 lb) (with scope and bipod)
- Length: 1,330 mm (52.4 in)
- Barrel length: 1,020 mm (40.2 in) (with muzzle brake)
- Cartridge: 20×110mm
- Action: Bolt Action
- Muzzle velocity: 850 m/s (2,789 ft/s)
- Effective firing range: 1,800 m
- Sights: Kahles K 312 II 3-12×50

The RT-20 is a Croatian bullpup anti-materiel rifle developed by Metallic in Rijeka in the mid-1990s and marketed by RH-Alan. The name itself is an acronym of the Croatian word Ručni Top 20, or "Hand Cannon 20mm". Operating with a bolt action, it houses a single 20mm round and must be reloaded after each shot. Given its large caliber, it is one of the most powerful anti-materiel rifles currently in use by any country and is comparable to the South African Denel NTW-20 and the Indian Vidhwansak.

== Specifications ==
A unique feature of the weapon is the counter-recoil reactive tube above the barrel. This venturi tube funnels gasses from the propellant rearwards and over the shooter's shoulder, similar to that of a recoilless rifle. This method of recoil reduction is rarely used in small arms due to the dangerous and highly visible backblast area it generates, and the RT-20 is no exception. An additional feature that differentiates RT-20 from other anti-armor and anti-materiel rifles is the placement of the bolt behind the shooter's head. This determines that either the user has a teammate, or they must take the rifle off of their shoulder to reload.

Chambering 20x110mm Hispano, the rifle fires a 130 gram (2,006 grains) projectile at a muzzle velocity of 850 m/s, producing a massive muzzle energy of 46,962.5 J. It is likely that this cartridge was chosen for logistical reasons as it is also fired by the Zastava M55 anti-aircraft autocannon. Such a large amount of energy requires the use of nine lugs on the head of the bolt in an interrupted thread pattern, designed to unlock when turned 60 degrees clockwise. The large cartridge size allows for a wide variety of ammunition to be used including AP, API, APIT, HE, HEI, HEIT, SAPHEI, APDS, HE-M, as well as the potential to easily develop future unique loadings such as airburst or guided munitions.

== Users ==
- Croatia - in limited use

== See also ==
- List of bullpup firearms
- List of sniper rifles
- Truvelo Sniper Rifles
