= List of aircraft of Denmark in World War II =

This is a list of Danish aircraft of World War II. Nazi Germany banned Denmark from having aircraft when they occupied the country, so you will not find any aircraft after 1940.

== Fighters ==
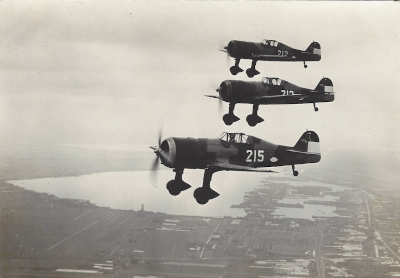
- A flight of Dutch Fokker D.XXI Fighters. The Fokker D.XXI was Denmark's most advanced fighter when the German invasion occurred. 23 were available. The main Danish variant of the DXXI was similar to the Bf 109Es used by Germany at the time.
  Bristol Bulldog
- Gloster Gauntlet
- Fokker D.XXI

== Naval fighters ==
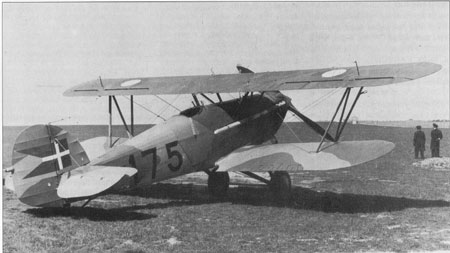
- Danish variant of the Hawker Nimrod
  Hawker Nimrod/Nimrodderne

== Bombers ==
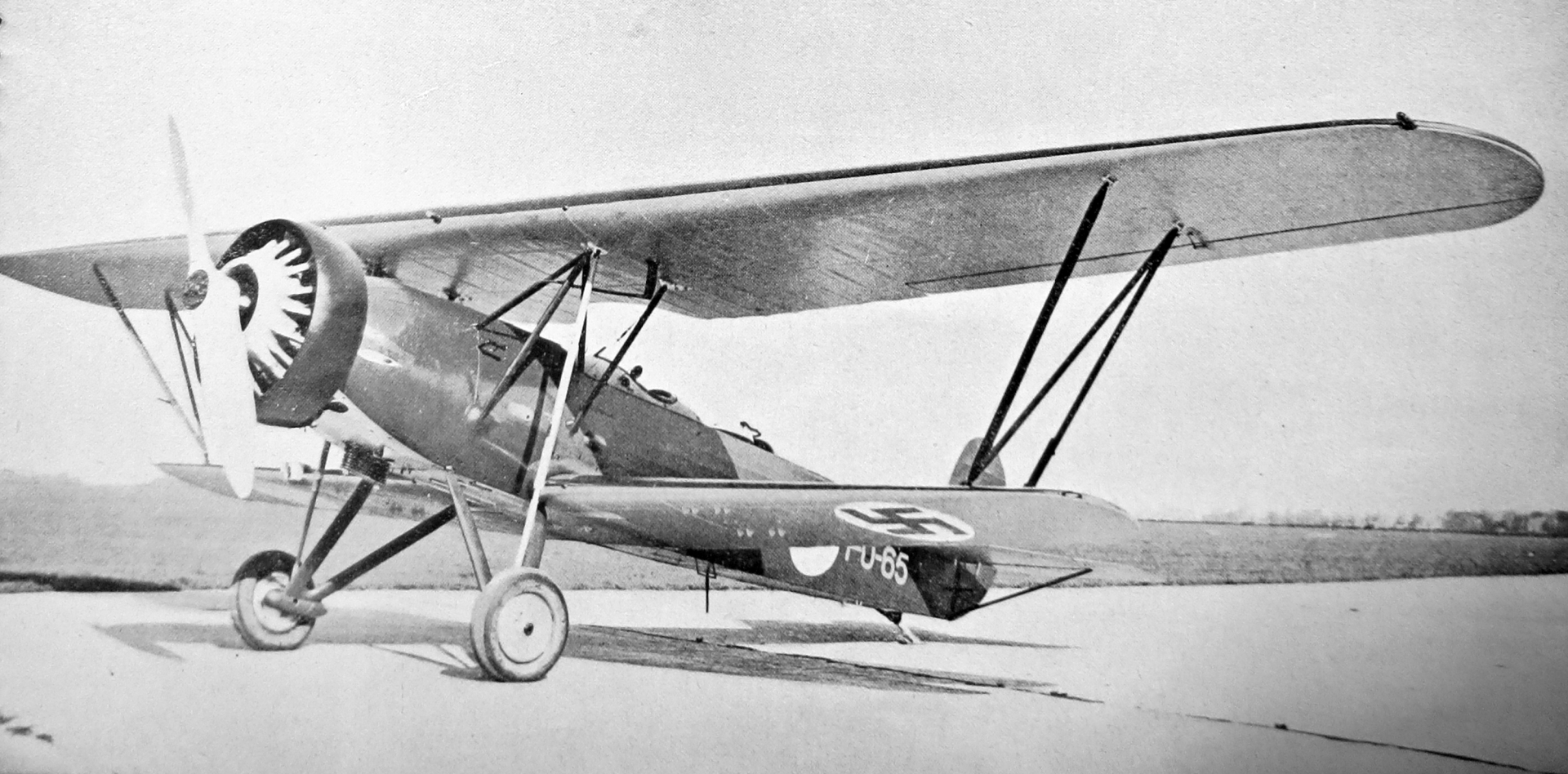
- A Finnish Fokker C.V aircraft. This made up Denmark's bomber force during the invasion.
  Fokker C.V
- Hawker Dantorp

== Reconnaissance ==
- Heinkel HE 8

== Trainers ==
- Avro Tutor
- de Havilland Tiger Moth

== Other ==
- Cierva C.30
