= Vektor GA-1 =

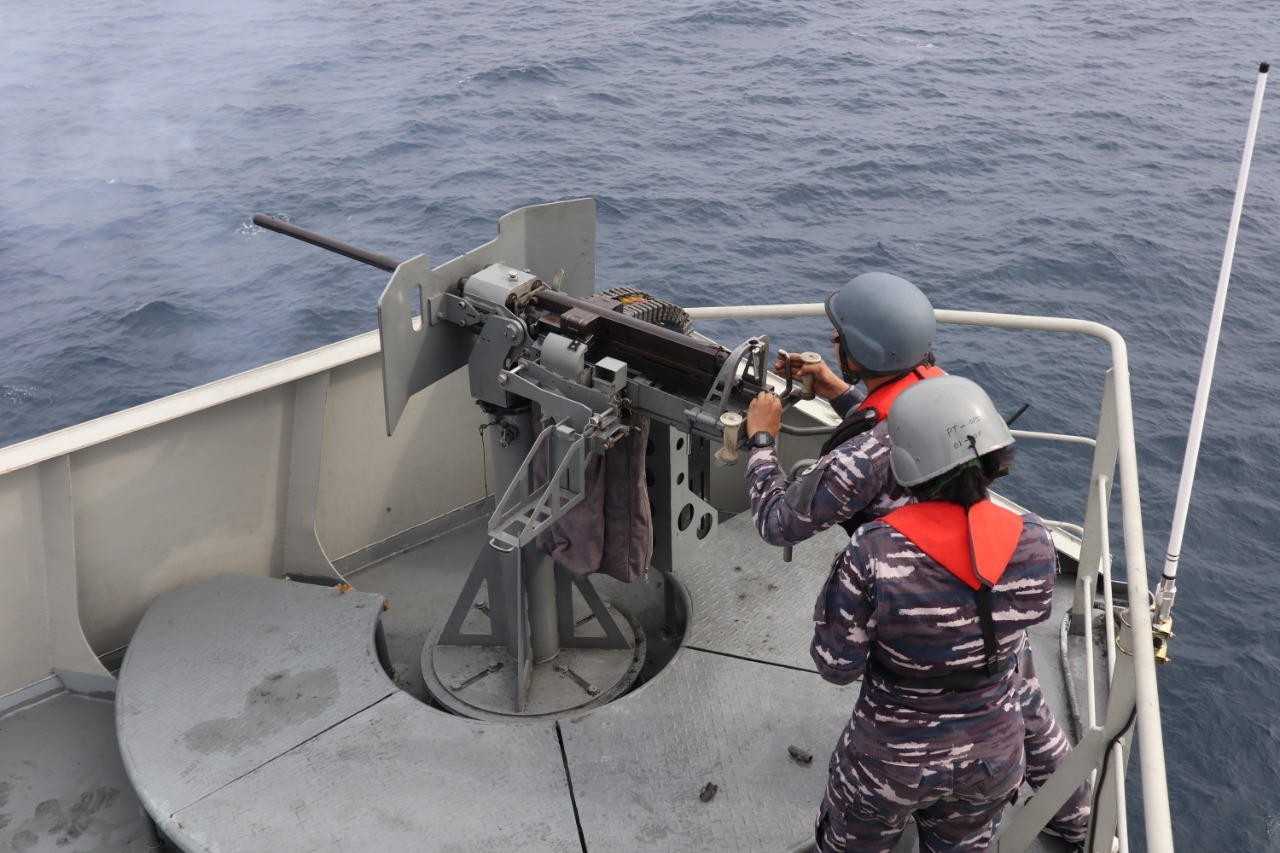
- GA-1 in Indonesian navy service
- Type: Autocannon
- Place of origin: South Africa

Service history
- Used by: South African National Defence Force; Indonesian Navy

Production history
- Manufacturer: Denel

Specifications
- Mass: 39 kilograms (86 lb)
- Length: 1.77 metres (5 ft 10 in)
- Height: 195 millimetres (7.7 in)
- Caliber: 20×82mm
- Rate of fire: 750 rds/min

The Denel Vektor GA-1 is an automatic cannon based on the German WWII MG 151/20 automatic cannon. Compared to other rapid-fire 20 mm autocannons, it is lightweight and has low recoil due to its design and the use of the 20×82mm cartridge. The weapon was intended for use in vehicles, naval vessels, and helicopters. One gun was fitted to the Atlas XH-1 Alpha attack helicopter demonstrator.
