= Indian Armed Forces =

Combined military forces of India

- Patch

- Flag
- Service branches: Indian Army; Indian Air Force; Indian Navy
- Headquarters: Ministry of Defence, South Block, New Delhi

Leadership
- President: (India) Droupadi Murmu
- Prime Minister: (India) Narendra Modi
- Minister of Defence: Rajnath Singh
- Chief of Defence Staff: General N. S. Raja Subramani
- Chief of Army Staff: General Dhiraj Seth
- Chief of Air Staff: Air Chief Marshal Ashutosh Dixit
- Chief of Naval Staff: Admiral Krishna Swaminathan
- Defence Secretary: Rajesh Kumar Singh, IAS
- Chief of Integrated Defence Staff: Air Marshal Tejinder Singh

Personnel
- Military age: 16½
- Conscription: No
- Active personnel: 1,431,000 (ranked 2nd)
- Reserve personnel: 1,000,000

Expenditure
- Budget: ₹6.81 lakh crore (equivalent to ₹7.0 trillion or US$75 billion in 2026) (2025/26) (ranked 5th)
- Percent of GDP: 2.22% (2025/26)

Industry
- Domestic suppliers: List Munitions India Limited (MIL); Armoured Vehicles Nigam Limited (AVNL); Advanced Weapons and Equipment India Limited (AWEIL); Troop Comforts Limited (TCL); Yantra India Limited (YIL); India Optel Limited (IOL); Gliders India Limited (GIL); Hindustan Aeronautics Limited (HAL); Bharat Electronics Limited (BEL); Bharat Earth Movers Limited (BEML); Bharat Dynamics Limited (BDL); Mazagon Dock Shipbuilders Limited (MDSL); Goa Shipyard Limited (GSL); Cochin Shipyard Limited (CSL); Garden Reach Shipbuilders and Engineers (GRSE); Mishra Dhatu Nigam (MDN)
- Foreign suppliers: Brazil; Russia; European Union; France; Japan; Israel; South Korea; Switzerland; South Africa; Taiwan; United Kingdom; United States
- Annual imports: US$41.208 billion (2010–2021)
- Annual exports: US$4.1 billion (FY 2025–2026)

Related articles
- History: Military history of India; Presidency armies British Indian Army; Royal Indian Navy; Royal Indian Air Force; Indian National Army; Wars involving India
- Ranks: Army; Navy; Air Force

The Indian Armed Forces are the military forces of the Republic of India. It consists of three professional uniformed services: the Indian Army, the Indian Navy, and the Indian Air Force. Additionally, the Indian Armed Forces are supported by the Central Armed Police Forces, the Indian Coast Guard, and the Special Frontier Force and various inter-service commands and institutions such as the Strategic Forces Command, the Andaman and Nicobar Command, and the Integrated Defence Staff. The President of India is the Supreme Commander of the Indian Armed Forces but the executive authority and responsibility for national security is vested in the Prime Minister of India and their chosen Cabinet Ministers. The Indian Armed Forces are under the management of the Ministry of Defence of the Government of India. With a strength of over 1.4 million active personnel, it is the world's second-largest military force and has the world's largest volunteer army. It also has the fifth-largest defence budget in the world.

The Indian Armed Forces have been engaged in several major military operations, including: the Indo-Pakistani wars of 1947, 1965, and 1971, the Portuguese-Indian War, the Sino-Indian War, the Indo-China War of 1967, the Kargil War, the Siachen conflict, and the 2025 India-Pakistan conflict among others. India honours its armed forces and military personnel annually on Armed Forces Flag Day, which falls on 7 December. Armed with the nuclear triad, the Indian Armed Forces are steadily undergoing modernisation, with investments in areas such as futuristic soldier systems and ballistic missile defence systems.

The Department of Defence Production of the Ministry of Defence is responsible for the indigenous production of equipment used by the Indian Armed Forces. It comprises 16 Defence PSUs. India remains one of the largest importers of defence equipment with Russia, Israel, France and the United States being the top foreign suppliers of military equipment. The Government of India, as part of the Make in India initiative, seeks to indigenise manufacturing and reduce dependence on imports for defence.

== History ==
India has one of the longest military histories, dating back several millennia. The first reference to armies is found in the Vedas. Classical Indian texts on archery in particular, and martial arts in general are known as Dhanurveda.

=== Ancient to medieval era ===
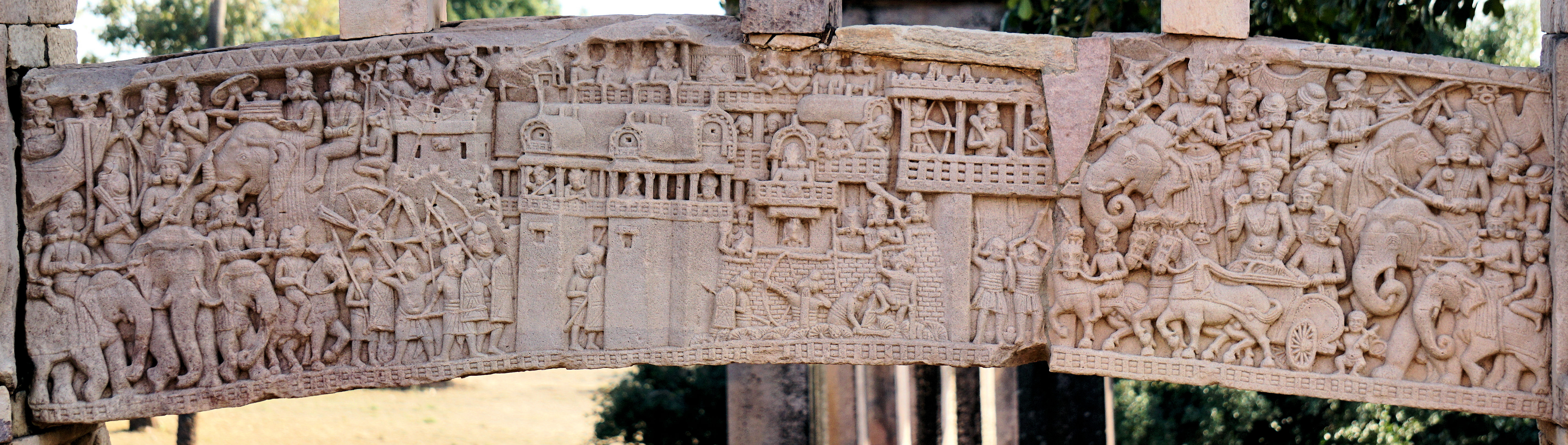
Siege of Kushinagar the capital of the Mallakas by seven Mahajanapadas' chiefs and their armies for the possession of relics of Buddha after his death in 4th century BCE. Depiction of the battle on Sanchi stupa railing, 1st century BCE.

Indian maritime history dates back 5,000 years. The first tidal dock is believed to have been built at Lothal around 2300 BC during the Indus Valley civilisation period, near the present day port of Mangrol on the Gujarat coast. The Rig Veda, written around 1500 BC, credits Varuna with knowledge of the ocean routes and describes naval expeditions. There is a reference to the side wings of a vessel called Plava, which gives the ship stability in storm conditions. A compass, Matsya yantra was used for navigation in the fourth and fifth centuries AD. The earliest known reference to an organisation devoted to ships in ancient India is in the Mauryan Empire from the 4th century BC. Powerful militaries included those of the: Maurya, Satavahana, Chola, Vijayanagara, Mughal and Maratha empires. Emperor Chandragupta Maurya's mentor and advisor Chanakya's Arthashastra devotes a full chapter on the state department of waterways under navadhyaksha (Sanskrit for Superintendent of ships). The term, nava dvipantaragamanam (Sanskrit for "sailing to other lands by ships," i.e., exploration) appears in this book in addition to appearing in the Vedic text, Baudhayana Dharmashastra as the interpretation of the term, Samudrasamyanam.

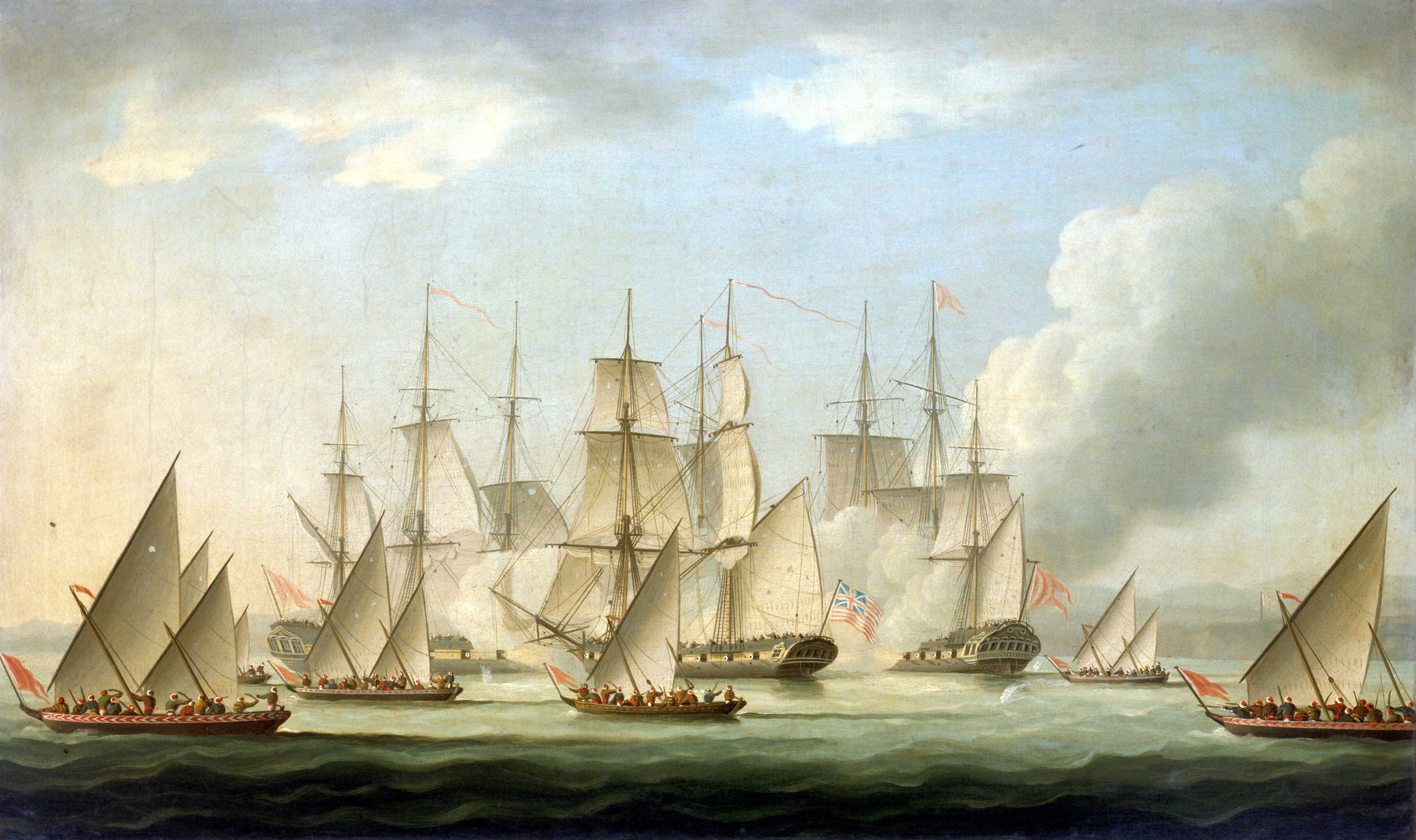
A depiction of a Maratha naval attack in 1812 against the East India Company's ship Aurora.

Sea lanes between India and neighbouring lands were used for trade for many centuries, and are responsible for the widespread influence of Indian Culture on other societies. The Cholas excelled in foreign trade and maritime activity, extending their influence overseas to China and Southeast Asia. During the 17th and 18th centuries, the Maratha and Kerala fleets were expanded and became the most powerful Naval Forces in the subcontinent, defeating European navies at various times (See the Battle of Colachel). The fleet review of the Maratha navy, at which the ships Pal and Qalbat participated, took place at the Ratnagiri fort. The Maratha Kanhoji Angre, and Kunjali Marakkar, the Naval chief of Saamoothiri were two notable naval chiefs of the period.

=== British India (1857 to 1947) ===
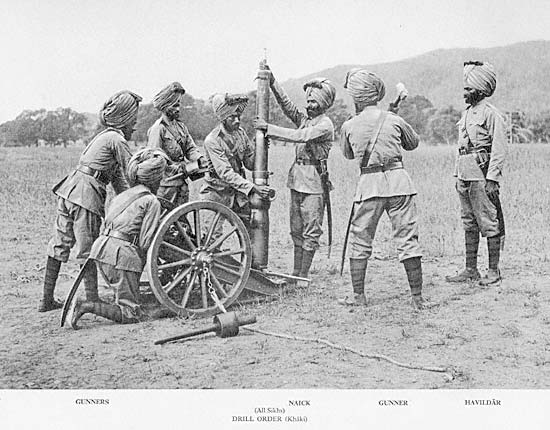
A mountain artillery crew from the British Indian Army demonstrating assembly of the RML 2.5 inch Mountain Gun, c. 1895.

The Royal Indian Navy was first established by the British while much of India was under the control of the East India Company. In 1892, it became a maritime component as the Royal Indian Marine (RIM).

During World War I, the Indian Army contributed several divisions and independent brigades to the European, Mediterranean, and Middle Eastern theatres of war. One million Indian troops served overseas; 62,000 died, and another 67,000 were wounded. In total, 74,187 Indian soldiers died during the war. It fought against the German Empire in German East Africa and on the Western Front. Indian divisions were also sent to Egypt, Gallipoli, and nearly 700,000 served in Mesopotamia against the Ottoman Empire.

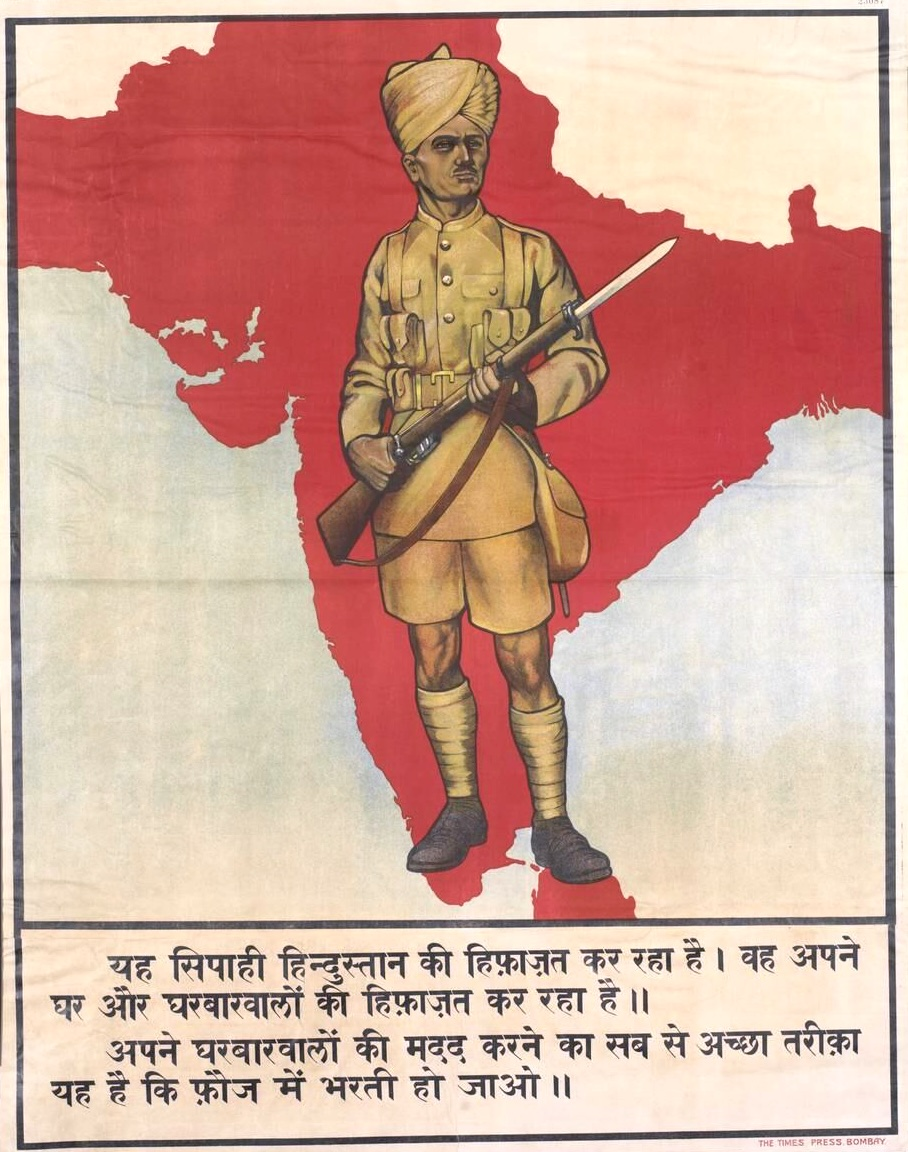
A Hindi Recruitment Poster encouraging Indian men to join the army during World War I. The text translates to "This soldier is defending India. He is defending his home and family. The best way to help your family is to enlist in the military."

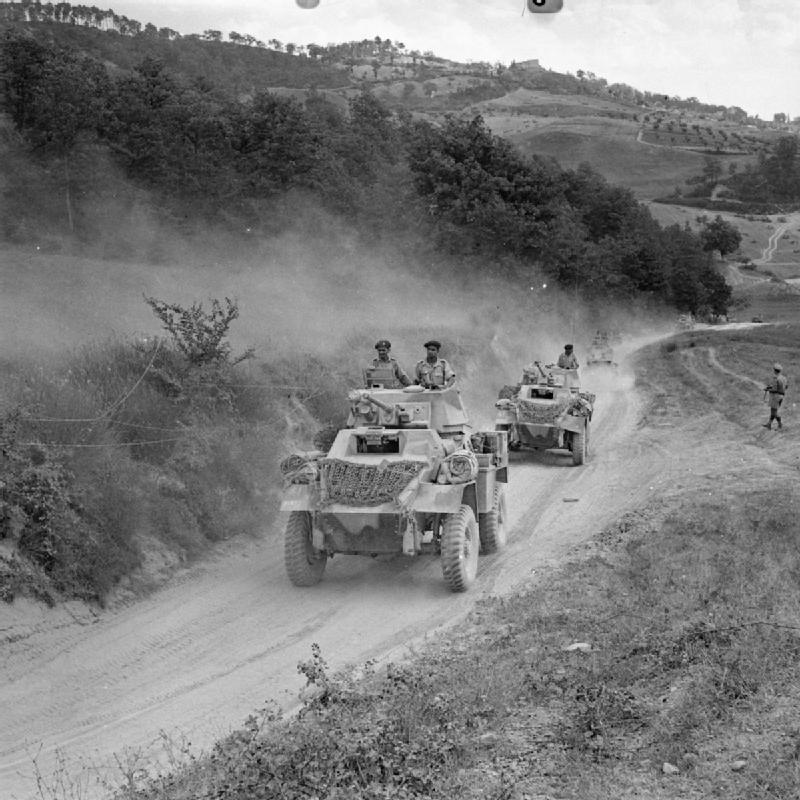
Humber armoured cars of 10th Indian Division move forward in Italy, 22 July 1944.

Following WWI, the Indian Armed Forces underwent a significant transformation. In 1928, Engineer Sub-lieutenant D. N. Mukherji became the first Indian to receive a commission in the Royal Indian Marine. In 1932, the Indian Air Force was established as an auxiliary air force within RAF India; two years later, the RIM was upgraded to the status of a naval service as the Royal Indian Navy (RIN).

Though the gradual "Indianisation" of the officer corps began after WWI, at the outbreak of war in 1939, there were no Indian flag, general, or air officers in the armed services. The highest-ranking Indian officers were those serving in the non-combatant Indian Medical Service, who held no rank higher than colonel; in the regular Indian Army, there were no Indian officers above the rank of major. The Royal Indian Navy had no Indian senior line officers and only a single Indian senior engineer officer, while the Indian Air Force had no Indian senior officers in 1939, with the highest-ranking Indian air force officer a flight lieutenant.

In World War II, the Indian Army began the war in 1939 with just under 200,000 men. By the end of the war, it had become the largest volunteer army in history, rising to over 2.5 million men by August 1945. Serving in divisions of infantry, armour, and a fledgling airborne forces, they fought on three continents in Africa, Europe, and Asia. The Indian Army fought in Ethiopia against the Italian Army, in Egypt, Libya, and Tunisia against both the Italian and German Army, and, after the Italian surrender, against the German Army in Italy. However, the bulk of the Indian Army was committed to fighting the Japanese Army, first during the British defeats in Malaya and the retreat from Burma to the Indian border; later, after resting and refitting for the victorious advance back into Burma, as part of the largest British Empire army ever formed. These campaigns cost the lives of over 36,000 Indian servicemen, while another 34,354 were wounded; 67,340 became prisoners of war. Their valour was recognised with the award of some 4,000 decorations, and 38 members of the Indian Army were awarded the Victoria Cross or the George Cross.

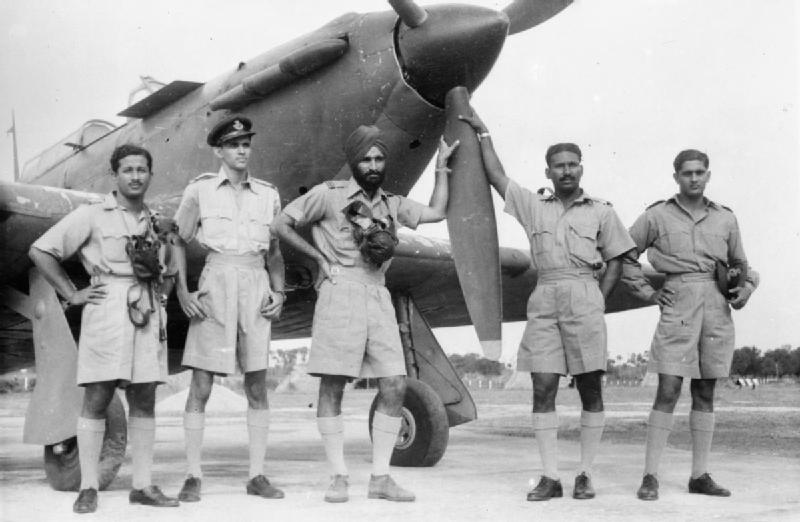
Indian pilots of No. 1 Squadron by a Hawker Hurricane.

The demands of war and increasing recognition that the era of British dominance in the subcontinent was ending increased the pace of "Indianisation." In 1940, Subroto Mukherjee (later the first Indian C-in-C and Chief of the Air Staff) became the first Indian to command an air force squadron and attain the (albeit acting) rank of squadron leader. In July 1941, Indian Medical Service officer Hiraji Cursetji became one of the first Indian officers to be promoted to substantive general officer rank. During the war, several Indian Army officers, notably Kodandera M. Cariappa, S. M. Shrinagesh and Kodandera Subayya Thimayya, all of whom would subsequently command the Indian Army, achieved distinction as the first Indian battalion and brigade commanders. On 1 May 1945, Cariappa became the first Indian officer to be promoted to brigadier.

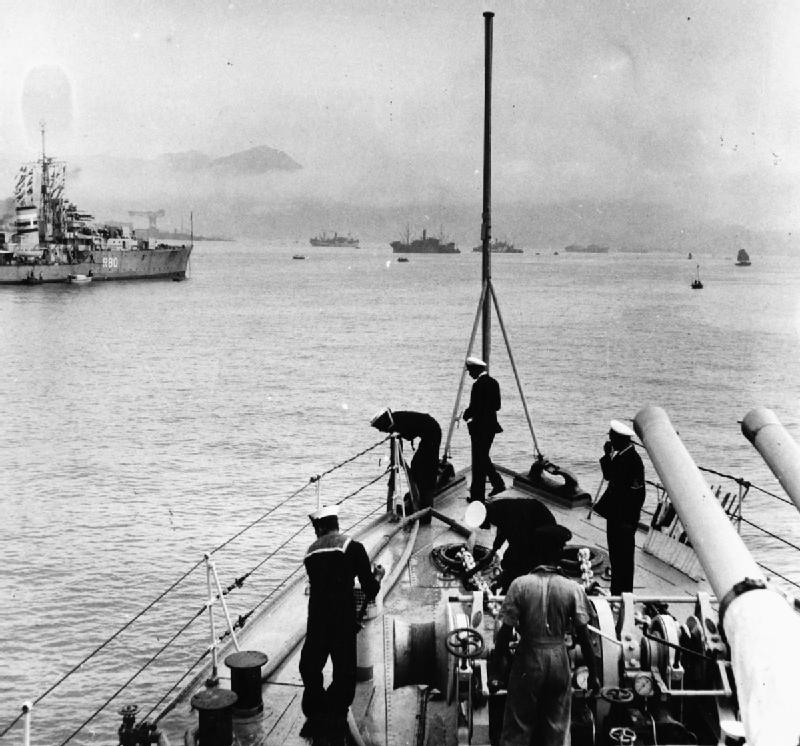
HMIS Sutlej leaves Hong Kong for Japan as part of the Allied forces of occupation.

At the end of hostilities in 1945, the Indian Army's officer corps included Indian Medical Service officer Hiraji Cursetji as its sole Indian major-general, one IMS brigadier, three Indian brigadiers in combatant arms and 220 other Indian officers in the temporary or acting ranks of colonel and lieutenant-colonel. From October 1945, the granting of regular commissions in the Indian Armed Forces was restricted to Indians, though provisions were made for the continued secondment of British officers for as long as was deemed necessary. In 1946, sailors of the Royal Indian Navy mutinied on board ships and in shore establishments. A total of 78 ships, 20 shore establishments, and 20,000 sailors were involved in the rebellion, which had an impact across India. Indianization of the armed forces nevertheless continued to progress. On 15 May 1947, Subroto Mukherjee became the first Indian air officer with the acting rank of air commodore, in the appointment of Deputy Assistant to the Air Officer Commanding (Administration). On 21 July, H.M.S. Choudhry and Bhaskar Sadashiv Soman, both of whom would eventually command the Pakistani and Indian Navies, respectively, became the first Indian Royal Indian Navy officers to be promoted to acting captain. On 30 July, Brigadiers K.M. Cariappa, Muhammad Akbar Khan and Maharaj Shri Rajendrasinhji Jadeja were promoted major-generals, the first Indian general officers in a combat arm of the Indian Army.

=== Dominion of India (1947–1950) ===
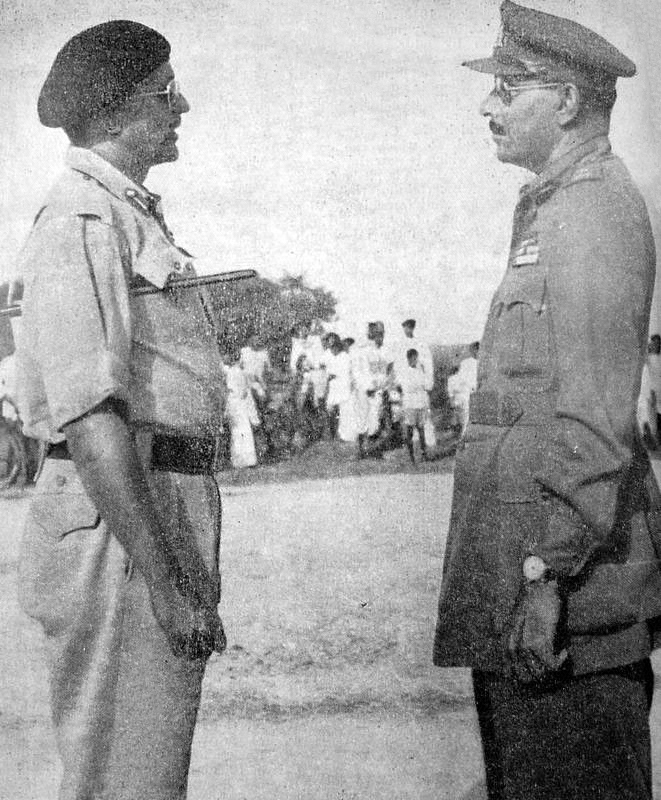
Major General Syed Ahmed El Edroos (at right) offers his surrender of the Hyderabad State Forces to Major General (later General and Army Chief) Joyanto Nath Chaudhuri at Secunderabad

The period immediately following Indian independence was a traumatic time for India and its armed forces. Along with the newly independent India, the Indian Armed Forces were forcibly divided between India and Pakistan, with ships, divisions, and aircraft allocated to the respective Dominions. Following partition, on 15 August 1947, the Indian Armed Forces comprised:

- The Royal Indian Navy (RIN): Four sloops, two frigates, 12 minesweepers, one corvette, one survey vessel, four armed trawlers, four motor minesweepers, four harbour defence launches and all landing craft of the pre-Independence RIN.
- Indian Army: 15 infantry regiments, 12 armoured corps units, 18.5 artillery regiments, and 61 engineer units. Of the Nepalese Gorkha regiments formerly attached to the British Indian Army, the 1st, 3rd, 4th, 5th (Royal), 8th and 9th Gorkha Rifles remained in Indian service, with the first and second battalions of the 2nd, 6th, 7th and 10th Gorkha Rifles placed in British Army service.
- The Royal Indian Air Force (RIAF): Seven fighter squadrons of Hawker Tempest II aircraft and one transport squadron of Douglas Dakota III/IV aircraft.

By the end of 1947, there were a total of 13 Indian major-generals and 30 Indian brigadiers, with all three army commands being led by Indian officers by October 1948, at which time only 260 British officers remained in the new Indian Army as advisers or in posts requiring certain technical abilities. With effect from April 1948, the former Viceroy's Commissioned Officers (VCO) were re-designated Junior Commissioned Officers (JCO), the distinction between King's Commissioned Indian Officers (KCIO) and Indian Commissioned Officers (ICO) was abolished and Indian Other Ranks were re-designated as "other ranks."

During this period, the armed forces of India were involved in several significant military operations, notably the Indo-Pakistani War of 1947 and Operation Polo, the code name of a military operation in September 1948 where the Indian Armed Forces invaded the State of Hyderabad, annexing the state into the Indian Union. On 15 January 1949, General K. M. Cariappa was appointed the first Indian Commander-in-Chief of the Indian army. In February 1949, the Indian government repealed colonial-era legislation that mandated limits on the recruitment of certain ethnic groups into the armed forces.

=== Republic of India (1950 to present) ===
Upon India becoming a sovereign republic on 26 January 1950, some of the last vestiges of British rule – such as rank badges, imperial crowns, British ensigns, and "Royal" monikers – were dropped and replaced with the Indian tricolour and the Lion Capital of Asoka. On 1 April 1951, the remaining units of Imperial Service Troops of the former princely states were integrated with the regular Indian Army, though only a percentage of the former princely states forces were found capable enough to be retained in active service. While India had become a republic, British officers seconded from the British Armed Forces continued to hold senior positions in the Indian Armed Forces into the early 1960s. On 1 April 1954, Air Marshal Subroto Mukherjee became the first Indian Commander-in-Chief of the Indian Air Force. Effective from 1 April 1955, a parliamentary act, the Commanders-In-Chiefs (Change in Designation) Act, re-designated the office of Commander-in-Chief as the Chief of Staff of each branch. Not until 1958 would the last British chief of staff of the Indian Navy be succeeded by an Indian. On 22 April of that year, Vice Admiral Ram Dass Katari became the first Indian Chief of Naval Staff. The Chiefs of Staff of the Indian Air Force and the Indian Navy were upgraded to four-star rank on par with the Chief of Army Staff in 1966 and 1968, respectively.

In 1961, tensions rose between India and Portugal over the Portuguese-occupied territory of Goa, which India claimed for itself. After Portuguese police cracked down violently on a peaceful, unarmed demonstration for union with India, the Indian government decided to invade and initiated Operation Vijay. A lopsided air, sea, and ground campaign resulted in the speedy surrender of Portuguese forces. Within 36 hours, 451 years of Portuguese colonial rule ended, and Goa was annexed by India.

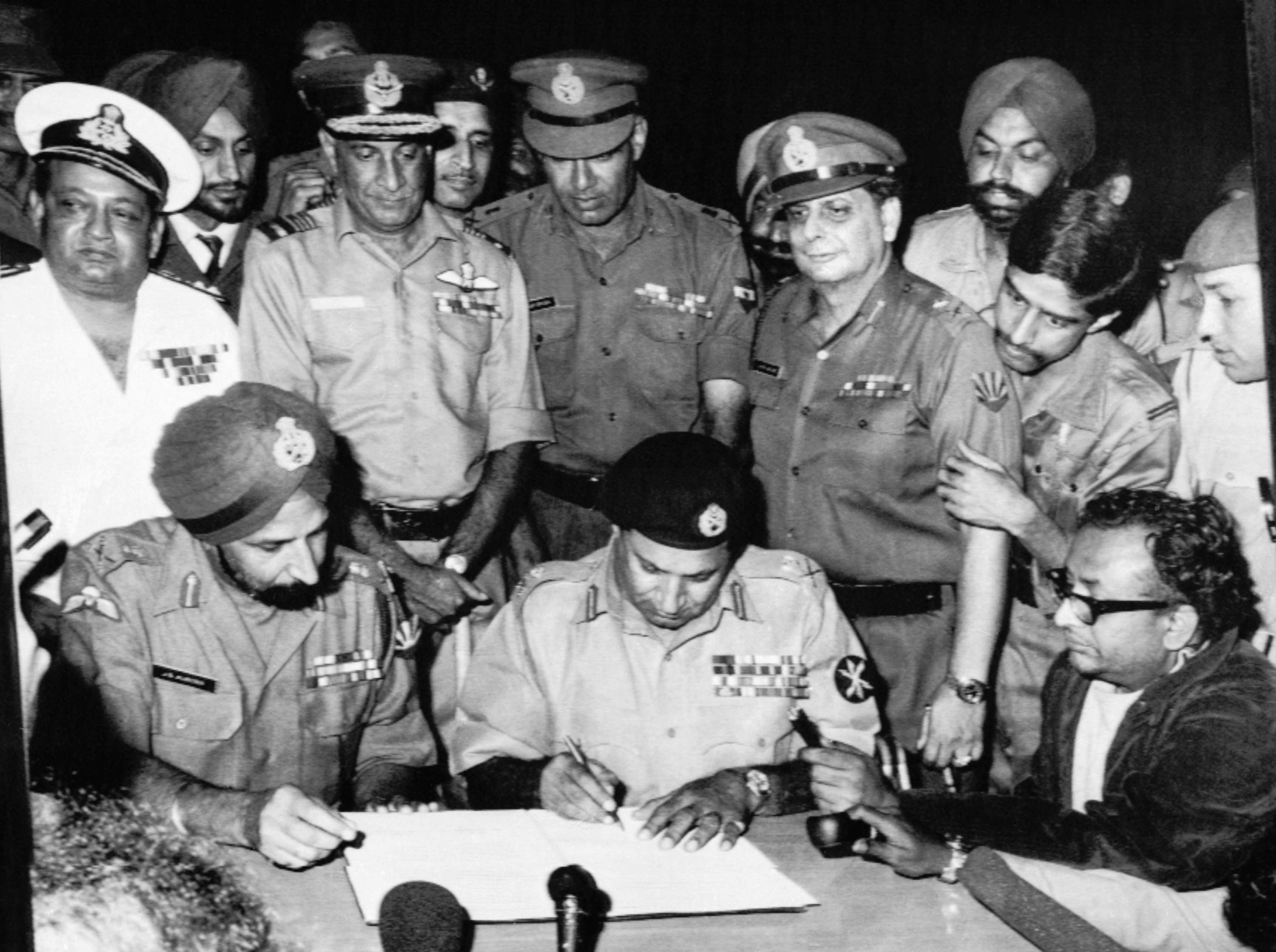
Pakistan's Lt. Gen. A. A. K. Niazi signing the instrument of surrender in Dhaka on 16 Dec' 1971, in the presence of India's Lt. Gen. J.S. Aurora. Standing behind them are officers of India's Army, Navy, and Air Force. The 1971 War directly involved participation of all three arms of the Indian Armed Forces.

India fought four major wars with its neighbour Pakistan in 1947, 1965, 1971 and 1999, and with China in 1962 and 1967. Indian victory over Pakistan in the 1971 war helped create the free country of Bangladesh. In the late 1970s and early 1980s, Pakistan began organising tourist expeditions to the Siachen Glacier, a disputed territory with India. Irked by this development, in April 1984 India initiated the successful Operation Meghdoot during which it gained control over all of the 70-kilometre (41-mile)-long Siachen Glacier, and all of its tributary glaciers, as well as the three main passes of the Saltoro Ridge immediately west of the glacier—Sia La, Bilafond La, and Gyong La. According to TIME magazine, India gained more than 1,000 square miles (3,000 km^{2}) of territory as a result of its military operations in Siachen. In 1987 and in 1989, Pakistan attempted to retake the glacier but was unsuccessful. The conflict ended with Indian Victory. Since 2003, the two sides have maintained a ceasefire and with "cold peace".

The Indian Peace Keeping Force (IPKF) carried out a mission in northern and eastern Sri Lanka in 1987–1990 to disarm the Tamil Tigers under the terms of the Indo-Sri Lanka Accord. It was a difficult battle for the Indian Army, which was not trained for an unconventional war. After losing approximately 1,200 personnel and several T-72 tanks, India ultimately abandoned the mission in consultation with the Sri Lankan government. In what was labelled as Operation Pawan, the Indian Air Force flew about 70,000 sorties to and within Sri Lanka.

The beginning of the 21st century saw a reorientation for India on the global stage from a regional role in the subcontinent to a major role in the Indian Ocean stretching from the Gulf of Aden to the Malacca Strait. India's sphere of influence has surpassed the South Asian subcontinent, and it has emerged as a regional power and "net security provider" in the Indo-Pacific region.

== Overview ==
The headquarters of the Indian Armed Forces is in New Delhi, the capital city of India. The President of India serves as the formal Supreme Commander of the Indian Armed Forces, while actual control lies with the executive headed by the Prime Minister of India. The Ministry of Defence (MoD) is the ministry charged with the responsibilities of countering insurgency and ensuring the external security of India. General Upendra Dwivedi is the Chief of the Army Staff (COAS), Admiral Krishna Swaminathan is the Chief of the Naval Staff (CNS) and Air Chief Marshal Amar Preet Singh is the Chief of the Air Staff (CAS).

=== Chiefs of the Indian Armed Forces ===
Flag	Position	Photo	Incumbent	Service Branch
	Supreme Commander of the Indian Armed Forces		Droupadi Murmu; President of India	Government of India
	Chief of Defence Staff (CDS)		General; N. S. Raja Subramani	Chief of Defence Staff (CDS)
	Chief of the Army Staff (COAS)		General; Dhiraj Seth	Indian Army
	Chief of the Air Staff (CAS)		Air Chief Marshal; Ashutosh Dixit	Indian Air Force
	Chief of the Naval Staff (CNS)		Admiral; Krishna Swaminathan	Indian Navy

The Indian armed forces are split into different groups based on their region of operation. The Indian Army is divided into six operational commands and one training command, each under the control of a Lieutenant Generals. The Indian Navy operates three commands. Each command is headed by a flag officer commanding-in-chief with the rank of vice admiral. The Indian Air Force is divided into five operational and two functional commands. Each command is headed by an air officer commanding-in-chief with the rank of air marshal. There are two joint commands whose head can belong to any of the three services. These are the Strategic Forces Command and the Andaman and Nicobar Command. Apart from these, there is an Integrated Defence Staff. The lack of an overall military commander has helped keep the Indian Armed Forces under civilian control and has prevented the rise of military dictatorships unlike in neighboring Pakistan.

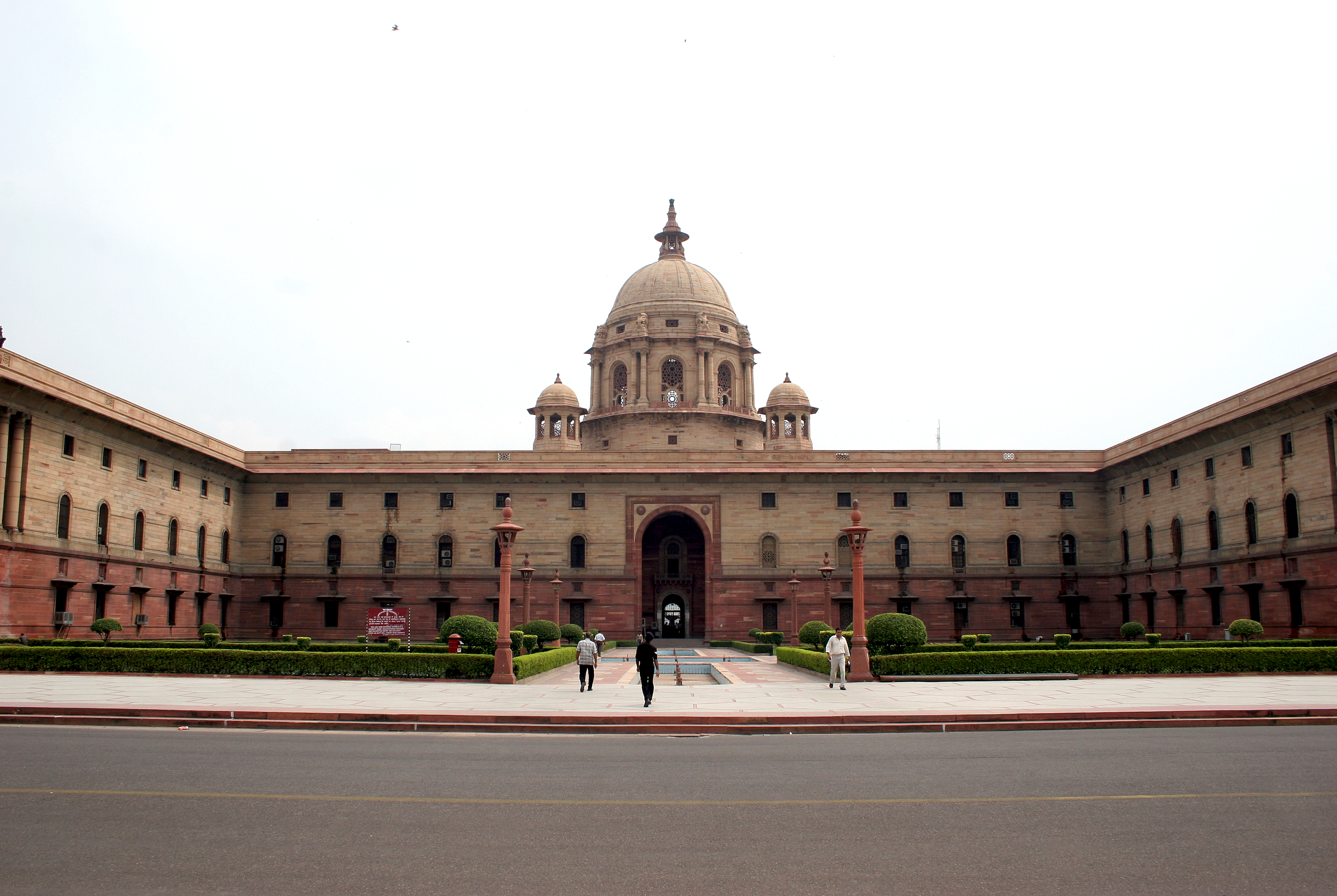
South Block in New Delhi is the headquarters of the Ministry of Defence.

The Armed Forces have four main tasks:

- To assert the territorial integrity of India.
- To defend the country if attacked by a foreign nation.
- To support the civil community in case of disasters (e.g., flooding).
- To participate in United Nations peacekeeping operations in consonance with India's commitment to the United Nations Charter.

The code of conduct of the Indian military is detailed in a semi-official book called Customs and Etiquette in the Services, written by retired Major General Ravi Arora, which details how Indian personnel are expected to conduct themselves generally. Arora is an executive editor of the Indian Military Review.

The major deployments of the Indian army constitute the border regions of India, particularly Jammu and Kashmir, Ladakh, and Northeast India, to engage in counter-insurgency and anti-terrorist operations. The major commitments of the Indian Navy constitute patrol missions, anti-piracy operations off the coast of Somalia, the 'Singapore Indian Maritime Bilateral Exercise' with the Republic of Singapore Navy in the Straits of Malacca, maintaining a military presence in Southeast Asias waters, and joint exercises with other countries, such as: Brasil, South Africa, the United States and Japan, France (Varuna naval exercises), the People's Republic of China, the Russian Navy (INDRA naval exercises), and others.

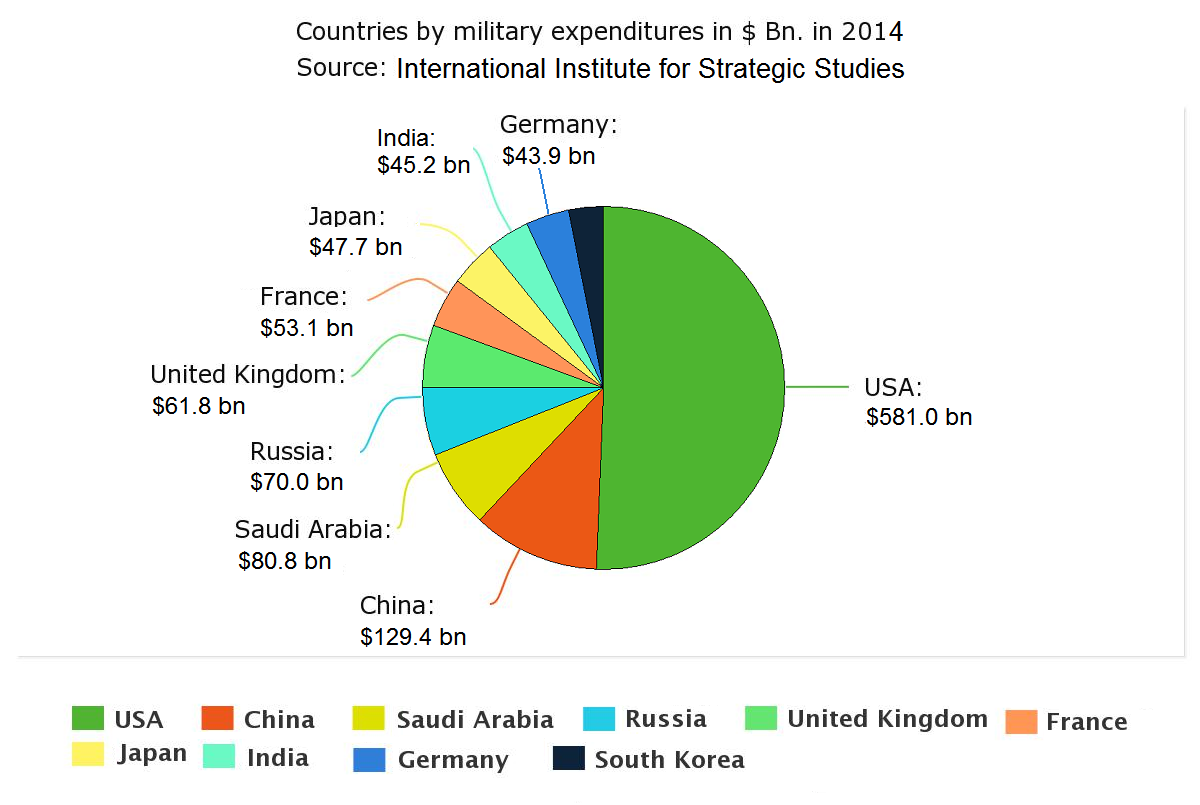
Top ten military expenditures in US$ Bn. in 2014, according to the International Institute for Strategic Studies.

Between April 2015 and March 2016, India allocated $40 billion to Defence Services, $10 billion to Defence (Civil Estimates) and another $10 billion to the Home Ministry for Paramilitary and CAPF forces – a total allocation for defence and security of about $60 billion for the financial year 2015–16. In 2016–17, the contribution to the Home Ministry has been increased from $10 billion to $11.5 billion.

Contemporary criticism of the Indian military have drawn attention to several issues, such as lack of political reform, obsolete equipment, lack of adequate ammunition, and inadequate research and development due to over-reliance on foreign imports. In addition, the lack of a 'strategic culture' among the political class in India is claimed to have hindered the effectiveness of the Indian military. Critics believe these issues hobble the progress and modernisation of the military. However, analysis by the Central Intelligence Agency indicates that India is projected to have the fourth most capable concentration of power by 2015. According to a report published by the US Congress, India is the developing world's leading arms purchaser. It is investing ₹99.7 billion (US$1.1 billion) to build a dedicated and secure optical fibre cable (OFC) network for exclusive use of the Army, Navy and Air Force. This will be one of the world's largest closed user group (CUG) networks.

=== Personnel ===
During 2010, the Indian Armed Forces had a reported strength of 1.4 million active personnel and 2.1 million reserve personnel. In addition, there were approximately 1.3 million paramilitary personnel, making it one of the world's largest military forces. A total of 1,567,390 ex- servicemen are registered with the Indian Army, the majority of them hailing from: Uttar Pradesh (271,928), Punjab (191,702), Haryana (165,702), Maharashtra (143,951), Kerala (127,920), Tamil Nadu (103,156), Rajasthan (100,592) and Himachal Pradesh (78,321). Many of them are re-employed in various Central government sectors.

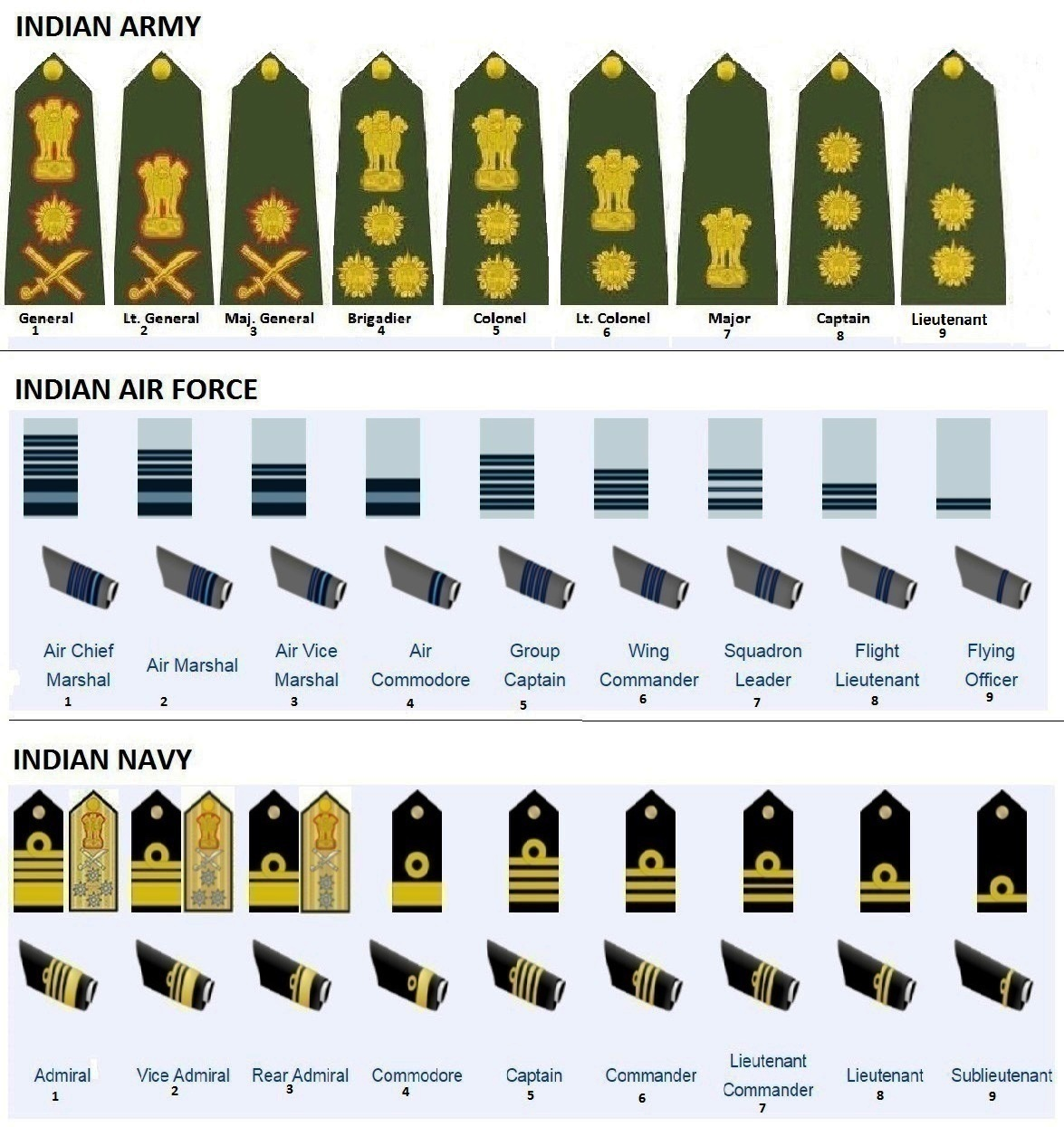
Picture showing equivalent ranks and insignia of Indian Armed Forces. (click to enlarge)

Equivalent ranks of Indian military
Commission	Indian Navy	Indian Army	Indian Air Force
Commissioned	Admiral of the fleet	Field marshal	Marshal of the Indian Air Force
Commissioned	Admiral	General	Air chief marshal
Commissioned	Vice admiral	Lieutenant general	Air marshal
Commissioned	Rear admiral	Major general	Air vice marshal
Commissioned	Commodore	Brigadier	Air commodore
Commissioned	Captain	Colonel	Group captain
Commissioned	Commander	Lieutenant colonel	Wing commander
Commissioned	Lieutenant commander	Major	Squadron leader
Commissioned	Lieutenant	Captain	Flight lieutenant
Commissioned	Sub lieutenant	Lieutenant	Flying officer
Junior commissioned	Master chief petty officer 1st class	Subedar major (Note: Risaldar major in cavalry and armoured regiments)	Master warrant officer
Junior commissioned	Master chief petty officer 2nd class	Subedar (Note: Risaldar in cavalry and armoured regiments)	Warrant officer
Junior commissioned	Chief petty officer	Naib subedar (Note: Naib risaldar in cavalry and armoured regiments. Called jemadar until 1965.)	Junior warrant officer
Non-commissioned	Petty officer	Havildar/Daffadar	Sergeant
Non-commissioned	Leading seaman	Naik/Lance daffadar	Corporal
Non-commissioned	Seaman 1	Lance naik/Acting Lance-Daffadar	Leading aircraftsman
Non-commissioned	Seaman 2	Sepoy/Sowar	Aircraftsman

The highest wartime gallantry award given by the Military of India is the Param Vir Chakra (PVC), followed by the Maha Vir Chakra (MVC) and the Vir Chakra (VrC). Their peacetime equivalents are Ashoka Chakra Award, Kirti Charka, and Shaurya Chakra respectively. The highest decoration for meritorious service is the Param Vishisht Seva Medal (PVSM), followed by Ati Vishisht Seva Medal (AVSM) and Vishisht Seva Medal (VSM). Awards for distinguished services rendered in wartime and hostilities are Uttam Yudh Seva Medal (UYSM) and Yudh Seva Medal (YSM).

==== Women in the armed forces ====
As of December 2021, the percentages of women serving across all ranks in the Army, Navy, and Air Force are 0.59%, 6.0%, and 1.08%, respectively. Women may serve at any rank in the Army and Air Force, but may only serve in the Navy as commissioned officers.

During the British Raj, the Temporary Indian Nursing Service was established in 1914 to meet the nursing needs of Indian soldiers serving in the First World War, with female Indian nurses serving as military auxiliaries. The Indian Military Nursing Service (MNS) was formed on 1 October 1926, with its officers integrated into the armed forces on 15 September 1943 and given the status of commissioned officers. Following Independence, apart from those serving in the MNS, women remained ineligible for regular commissions in the armed forces until 1 November 1958, when the restriction on granting permanent commissions to women was removed for those joining the Army Medical Corps. In 1961, Dr. Barbara Ghosh became the first female medical officer to be granted a permanent naval commission. On 27 August 1976, Gertrude Alice Ram, the military nursing service Matron-in-Chief, became the first woman officer in the Indian Army to attain the rank of major-general, and the first female officer in the Indian Armed Forces to attain two-star rank.

In January 1992, the Union government sanctioned the induction of women into non-combatant branches of the Army while holding short-service commissions. On 28 November 1992, the Indian Navy became the first armed force to commission women on short-service commissions in non-medical streams (Education, Logistics and Naval Law). The Air Force approved the induction of women officers for ground duties in 1992, with those officers receiving their commissions on 1 June 1993, and opened the flying (non-fighter) and technical branches to women the same year, commissioning its first seven female pilots on 17 December 1994. Until December 1996, women short-service commission officers in the Armed Forces were limited to five years in service, excepting the technical branch of the air force, in which female officers could only serve for three years. In August 1998, the Navy opened all of its branches to women.

Punita Arora was appointed Commandant, Armed Forces Medical College on 1 September 2004 in the rank of lieutenant-general, becoming the first woman in the armed forces to reach three-star rank. In September 2008, women became eligible for permanent commissions in the Judge Advocate General (JAG) and Education Corps in all three services, along with the Naval Constructor branch of the Navy and in the Accounts branch of the Air Force. This made them eligible to be promoted by selection in those streams (to the ranks of colonel, captain and group captain, and to the flag ranks), as short-service commissions are relinquished after 14 years of service. In November 2011, women Air Force officers further became eligible for permanent commissions in the Technical, Administration, Logistics, and Meteorology Branches.

=== Branches ===
Total active personnel under Ministry of Defence
1. Indian Army 1,237,117 (83.1%)
2. Indian Navy 67,228 (4.52%)
3. Indian Air Force 139,576 (9.38%)
4. Indian Coast Guard 11,000 (0.74%)
5. Border Roads Organisation 33,230 (2.23%)

Indian Armed Forces
	Active	Reserve	Governing Body	Area
Indian Army	1,237,117	960,000	Ministry of Defence	
Indian Navy	67,228	55,000	Ministry of Defence	
Indian Air Force	139,576	140,000	Ministry of Defence	
Indian Coast Guard	11,000		Ministry of Defence	
Border Roads Organisation	33,230		Ministry of Defence	
	1,488,151	1,155,000		
Paramilitary Forces
	Active	Reserve	Governing Body	Area
Assam Rifles	66,000		Ministry of Home Affairs	
Special Frontier Force	10,000		Ministry of Home Affairs	
	76,000	N.A.		
Central Armed Police Forces and Others
	Active	Reserve	Governing Body	Area
Border Security Force	265,000		Ministry of Home Affairs	India-Pakistan Border, India-Bangladesh Border, and others
Central Industrial Security Force	163,590		Ministry of Home Affairs	Industries and PSUs in India
Central Reserve Police Force	313,634		Ministry of Home Affairs	All India
Indo-Tibetan Border Police	89,432		Ministry of Home Affairs	India-China Border
National Security Guard	12,000		Ministry of Home Affairs	On Special duty in India
Sashastra Seema Bal	94,261		Ministry of Home Affairs	India-Nepal Border and India-Bhutan Border
Railway Protection Force	76,563		Ministry of Railways	Indian Railways
National Disaster Response Force	13,000		Ministry of Home Affairs	Area prone to disaster in India
Defence Security Corps	31,000		Territorial Army branch of the Indian Army	Defence installations of Indian Armed Forces
Special Protection Group	3,000		Cabinet Secretariat	Prime Minister of India
State Armed Police Forces	450,000		State governments of India	Respective States in India
Civil Defence		500,000	Ministry of Home Affairs	All India
Home Guard		441,800	Ministry of Home Affairs	Respective States in India
	1,511,480	941,800		

=== Recruitment and Training ===
==== Army (enlisted) ====
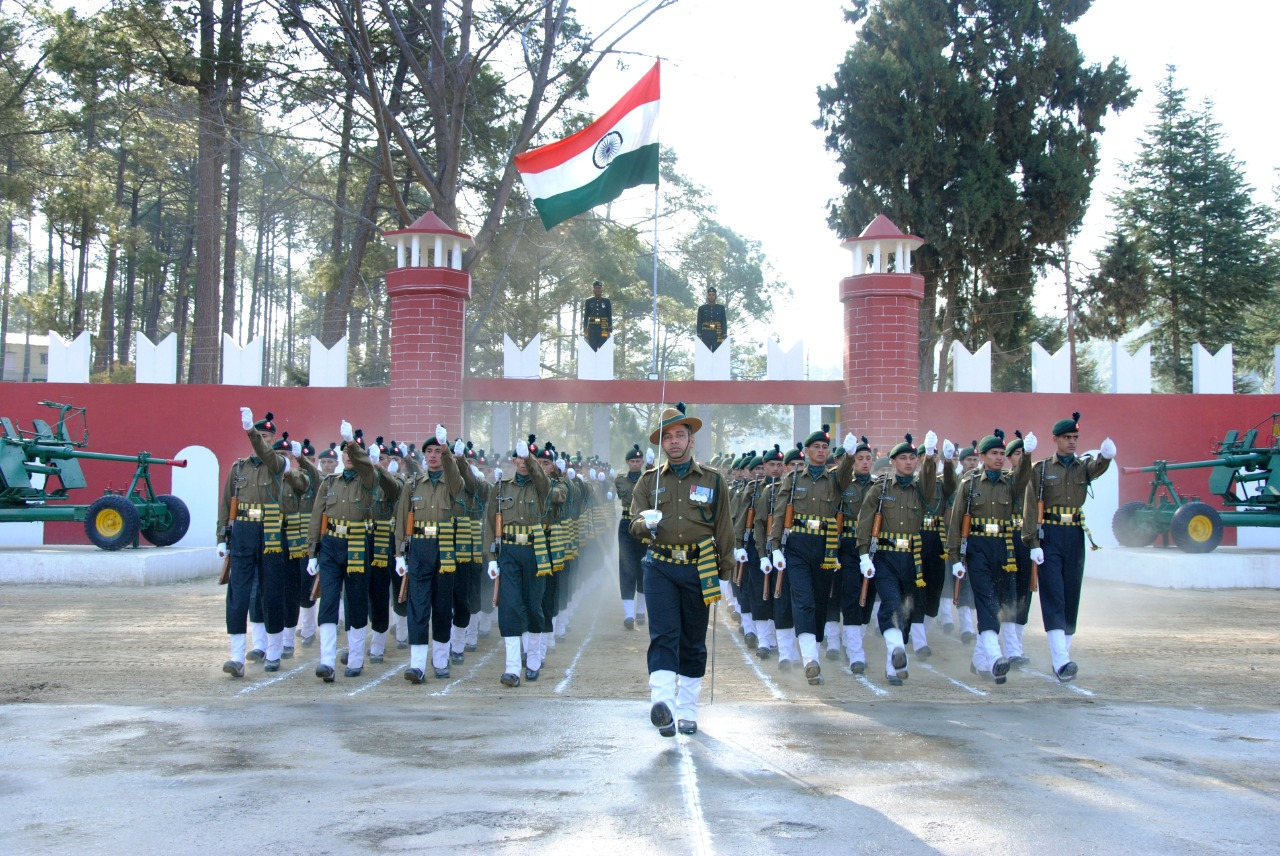
Kumaon Regimental Centre, a training centre of GD soldiers for Kumaon Regiment

The majority of the personnel in the Indian Army are enlisted soldiers, primarily under the Ground Duty (GD) category. These personnel are generally deployed to perform combat or combat-related roles. The soldiers are inducted into the army under the Agnipath scheme for four years, and 25% of them are retained after four years as a permanent cadre. A GD soldier shall have passed class 10 along with a matriculation certificate, and must be a citizen of India or Nepal or a subject of Bhutan. The age of the soldier must be 17½ to 21 years, and the candidates shall have no medical ailment or disease, and are evaluated for height, weight, vision, hearing, and physical fitness. Fitness tests include a 1.6 km Run, pull-ups, jumping a 9-foot ditch, and doing a zig-zag balance test.

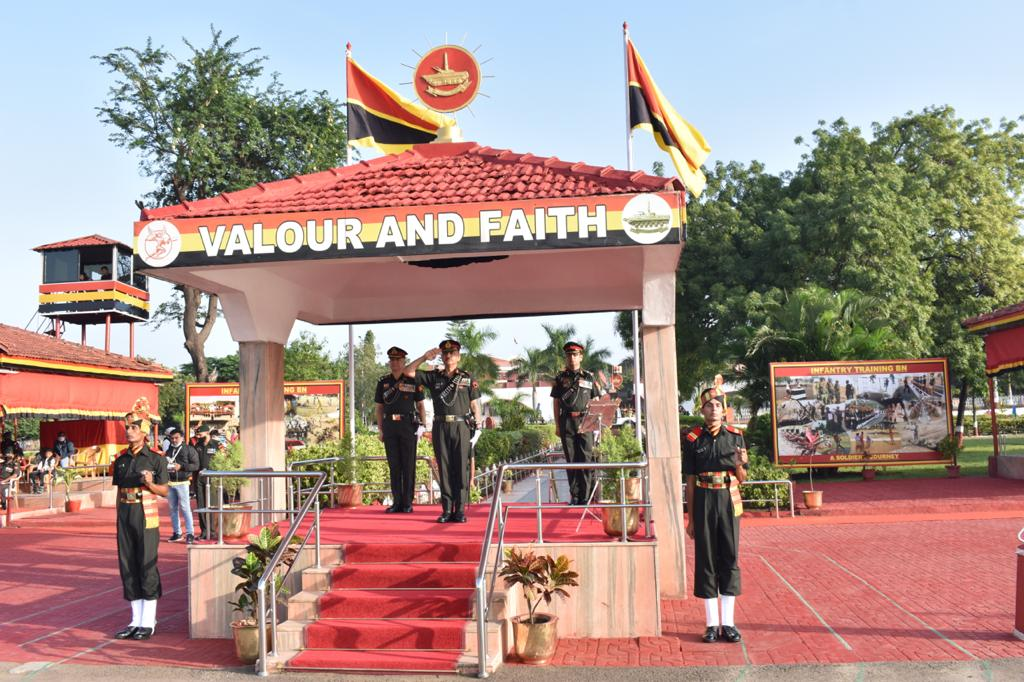
Regimental Centre of Mechanised Infantry, for training of technical and artillery soldiers

The army also recruits personnel for technical roles, such as artillery, signals, aviation technician, nursing assistant, etc. These roles require higher educational qualifications, i.e., Class 12 pass from the science stream or a diploma qualification. After selection, the candidates are sent for Basic Military Training at regimental centres.

==== Military academies ====
The Indian Armed Forces have set up numerous military academies across India for training personnel. Military Schools, Sainik Schools, and the Rashtriya Indian Military College were founded to broaden the recruitment base of the Defence Forces. The three branches of the Indian Armed Forces jointly operate several institutions such as: the National Defence Academy (NDA), the Defence Services Staff College (DSSC), the National Defence College (NDC) and the College of Defence Management (CDM) for training its officers. The Armed Forces Medical College (AFMC) is responsible for providing the entire pool of medical staff to the Armed Forces by giving them in-service training.

Officer recruitment is through many military-related academies. Besides the tri-service National Defence Academy (NDA) in Pune, the three services have their own training institutes for this purpose. These include: the Indian Military Academy (IMA) in Dehradun, the Indian Naval Academy (INA) in Ezhimala, the Air Force Academy in Dundigal, the Officers Training Academy (OTA) in Chennai and Gaya. Other notable training institutions are the Army War College (AWC) in Mhow, Madhya Pradesh, the High Altitude Warfare School (HAWS) in Gulmarg, Jammu and Kashmir, the Counter Insurgency and Jungle Warfare School (CIJW) in Vairengte, Mizoram, and the College of Military Engineering (CME) in Pune, Maharashtra. After being commissioned, officers are posted and deputed, and are at the helm of affairs not only inside India but also abroad. Officers are appointed and removed only by the President of India.

=== Foreign relations and overseas bases ===
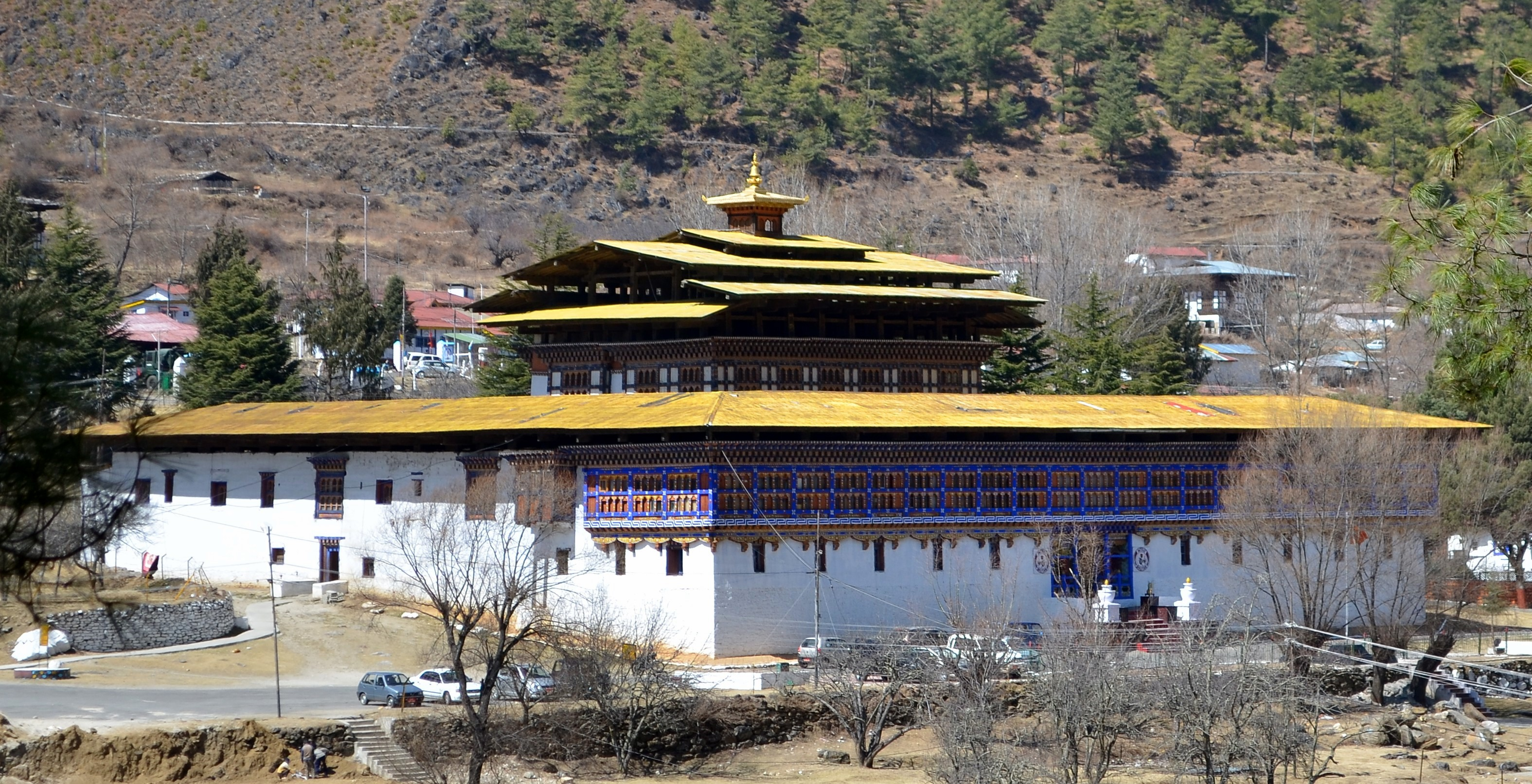
The Haa Dzong in Bhutan which houses the Headquarters of Indian Military Training Team (IMTRAT)

Farkhor Air Base is a military air base located near the town of Farkhor in Tajikistan, 130 kilometres (81 mi) southeast of the capital Dushanbe. It is operated by the Indian Air Force in collaboration with the Tajikistan Air Force. Farkhor is India's first and only military base outside its territory. There was an unconfirmed report of India building some assets at Ayni Air Base in Tajikistan, although the Tajik government has denied this. However, India had deployed its Army and Border Roads Organisation personnel to upgrade Ayni airbase by extending its runway, constructing an air-traffic control tower, and perimeter fencing around the base. India provided medium-lift choppers to Tajikistan and a dedicated hospital there as part of efforts to build on the strategic ties between the two countries against the backdrop of US-led troops pulling out from Afghanistan in 2014. India is also helping with the development of Chah Bahar Seaport in southeastern Iran, which is speculated to be done to secure India's Maritime assets and also as a gateway to Afghanistan & Central Asia. However, India and Israel also have a very strong defence relationship.

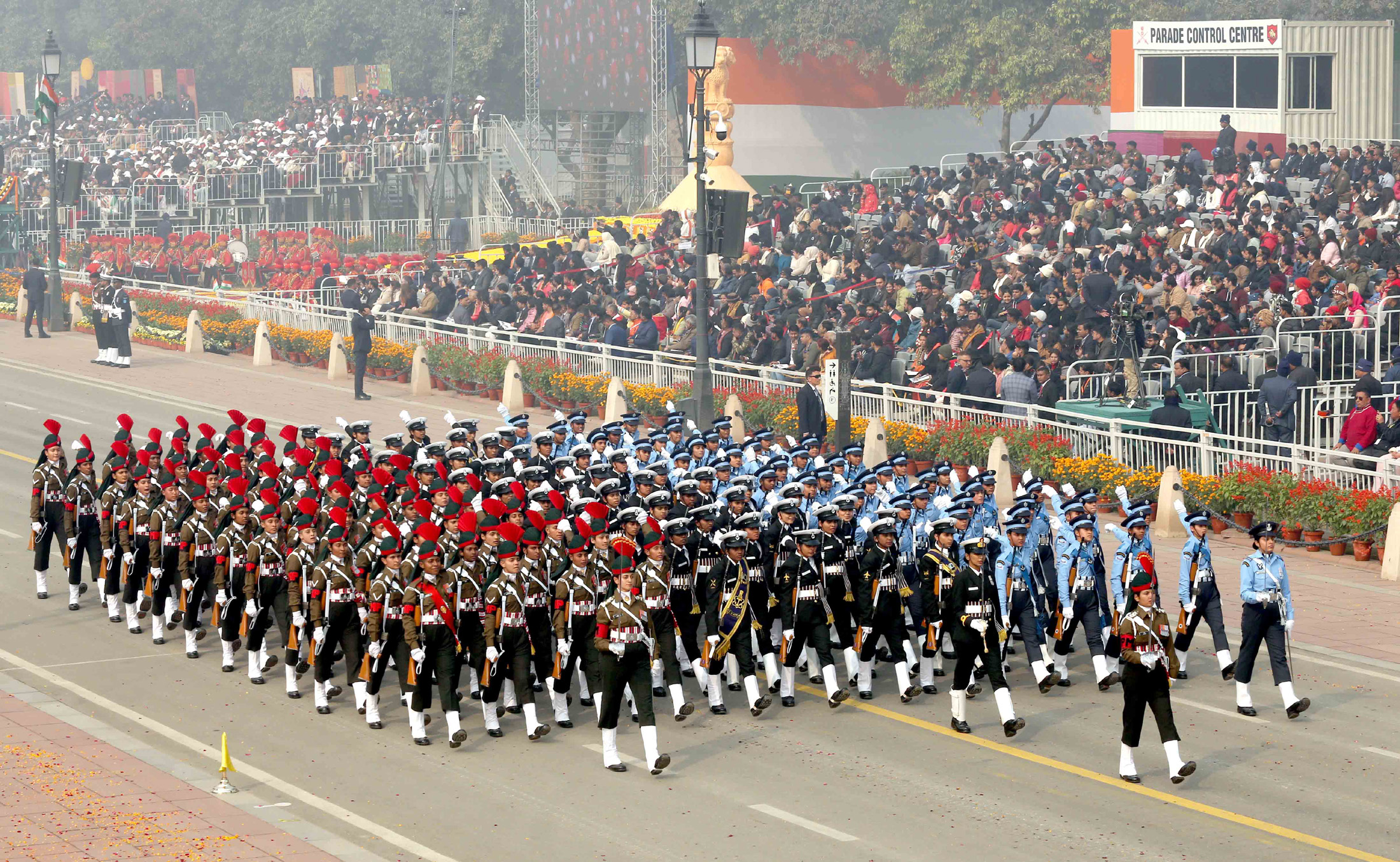
All Women Contingent from, all the three services of the Indian Armed Forces

In the 1950 Indo-Nepal Treaty of Peace and Friendship, India took on the obligation to actively assist Nepal in national defence and military preparedness, and both nations agreed not to tolerate threats to each other's security. In 1958, the then-Indian Prime Minister Jawaharlal Nehru visited Bhutan and reiterated India's support for Bhutan's independence and later declared in the Indian Parliament that any aggression against Bhutan would be seen as aggression against India. India started the process to bring the island country Maldives, into India's security grid. India is also one of three countries with whom Japan has a security pact, the others being Australia and the United States. India and Russia maintain strong military co-operation. India has defence pacts with the US, focusing on areas including security, joint training, joint development, and the manufacture of defence equipment and technology. In 1951, India and Burma signed a Treaty of Friendship in New Delhi. Article II of the treaty stipulates that "There shall be everlasting peace and unalterable friendship between the two States who shall ever strive to strengthen and develop further the cordial relations existing between the peoples of the two countries." India had signed a pact to develop ports in Myanmar and various bilateral issues, including economic co-operation, connectivity, security, and energy. India has a "comprehensive strategic partnership" with UAE. India has maritime security arrangements in place with Oman and Qatar. In 2008, a landmark defence pact was signed, under which India committed its military assets to protect "Qatar from external threats". On 9 June 2012, the JIMEX 2012 naval exercise took place off the coast of Tamil Nadu in India, from Tokyo in Japan. This was the first-ever bilateral maritime exercise between the two nations in a long time, reflecting their similar interests, especially those involving spontaneous regional security against common external aggressors. The Indian Navy has berthing rights in Oman and Vietnam.

As part of its two-decade-old Look East policy, India has substantially stepped up military engagement with East Asian and ASEAN nations. Although never explicitly stated, ASEAN and East Asian nations want New Delhi to be a counterweight to increasing Chinese footprints in the region. The Philippines, Thailand, Indonesia, and, particularly, Vietnam and Myanmar have time and again pressed India to help them both in terms of military training and weapons supply. Myanmar's Navy Chief, Vice Admiral Thura Thet Swe, during his four-day visit to India in late July 2012, held wide-ranging consultations with top officials from the Indian Ministry of Defence. Apart from increasing the number of training slots of Myanmar officers in Indian military training establishments, India has agreed to build at least four Offshore Patrol Vehicles (OPV) at Indian Shipyards to be used by Myanmar's navy. For more than a decade now, India has assisted Vietnam in beefing up its naval and air capabilities. For instance, India has repaired and upgraded more than 100 MiG 21 planes of the Vietnam People's Air Force and supplied them with enhanced avionics and radar systems. Indian Air Force pilots have also been training their Vietnamese counterparts. First, India has offered a $100-million credit line to Vietnam to purchase military equipment. A bilateral agreement for the use of facilities in India by the Singapore Air Force and Army was signed in October 2007 and August 2008, respectively, and has been extended up to 2017. Singapore is the only country to which India is offering such facilities.

== Indian Army ==
Indian Army's Arjun Mark 1A tank.

The Indian Army is a voluntary service; the military draft has never been imposed in India. It is one of the largest standing armies (and the largest standing volunteer army) in the world, with 1,237,000 active troops and 800,000 reserve troops. The force is headed by the Chief of Army Staff, General Upendra Dwivedi. The highest rank in the Indian Army is Field Marshal, but it is a largely ceremonial rank, and appointments are made by the President of India, on the advice of the Union Cabinet of Ministers, only in exceptional circumstances. Sam Manekshaw and K.M. Cariappa are the only two officers who have attained this rank.

The army has combat experience in diverse terrains and also has a distinguished history of serving in United Nations peacekeeping operations. India contributes 6000 of its personnel to the UN peacekeeping efforts, making it the second largest contributor. The Indian Army has seen military action during the First Kashmir War, Operation Polo, the Sino-Indian War, the Second Kashmir War, the Indo-Pakistani War of 1971, the Sri Lankan civil war and the Kargil War. The Indian Army has participated in several UN peacekeeping operations, including those in Cyprus, Lebanon, the Democratic Republic of the Congo, Angola, Cambodia, Vietnam, Namibia, El Salvador, Liberia, Mozambique, and Somalia. The army also provided a paramedical unit to facilitate the withdrawal of the sick and wounded in the Korean War.

=== Doctrine, corps, field force ===
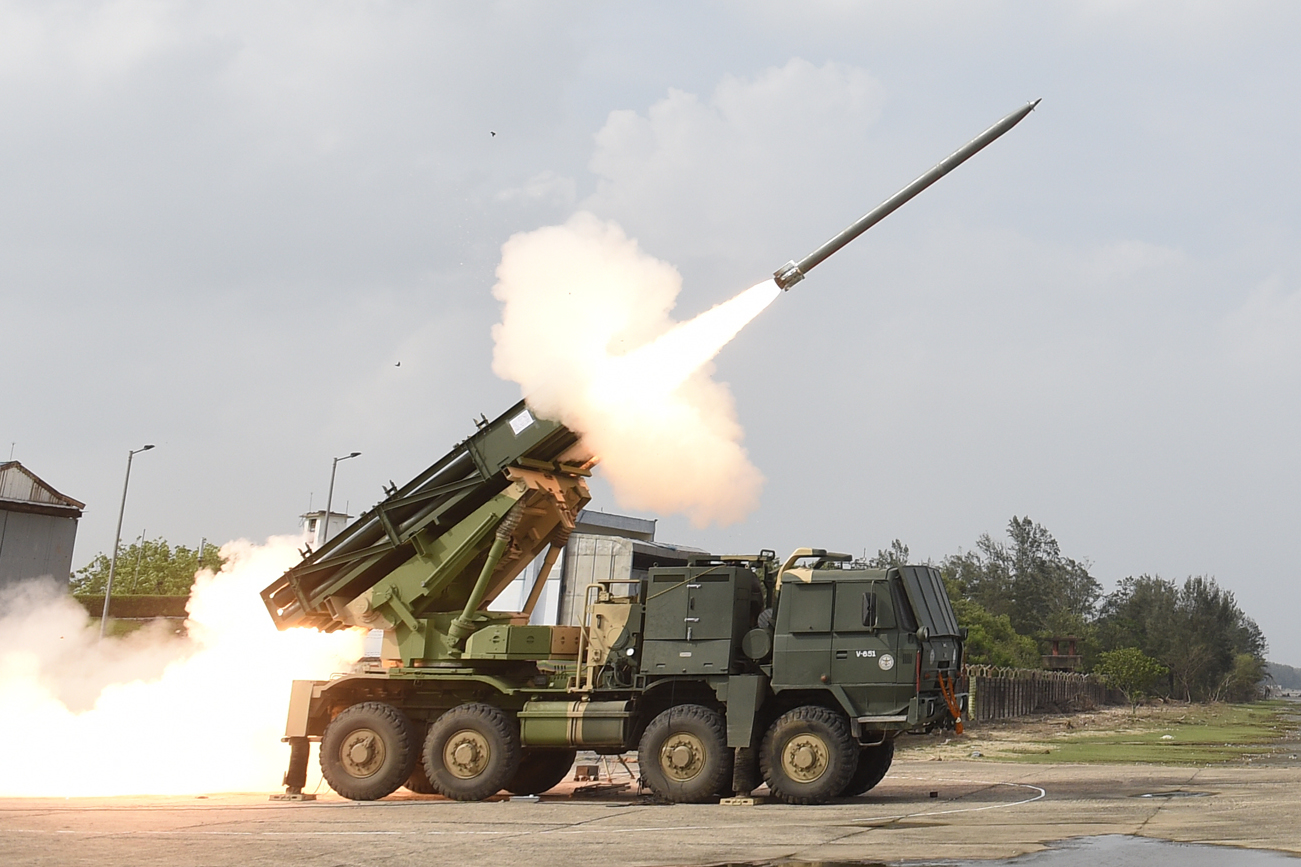
Indian Army Pinaka multi-barrel rocket launcher.

The current combat doctrine of the Indian Army is based on effectively utilising holding formations and strike formations. In the case of an attack, the holding formations would contain the enemy, and strike formations would counter-attack to neutralise enemy forces. In the case of an Indian attack, the holding formations would pin enemy forces down while the strike formations attack at a point of India's choosing. The Indian Army is large enough to devote several corps to the strike role. The army is also looking at enhancing its special forces capabilities. With the role of India increasing, and the need to protect India's interests on far-off shores becoming important, the Indian Army and Indian Navy are jointly planning to set up a marine brigade.

The Army's field force comprises fifteen corps, three armoured divisions, four Reorganised Army Plains Infantry Divisions (RAPID), eighteen infantry divisions, and ten mountain divisions, several independent brigades, and requisite combat support and service support formations and units. Among the fifteen, four are "strike" corps – Mathura (I Corps), Ambala (II Corps), Bhopal (XXI Corps) and Panagarh (XVII Corps). The main combat and combat support units are 68 armoured regiments, and over 350 infantry battalions and 300 artillery regiments (including two surface-to-surface missile (SSM) units). Among major armaments and equipment, there are 4,614 main battle tanks, more than 150,000 vehicles, 140 self-propelled artillery, 3,243 towed artillery, and more than 700 rocket artillery(MLRS) in the Indian Army.

==== Mountain Strike Corps ====
India has raised a new mountain strike corps to strengthen its defence along its disputed border with China in the high reaches of the Himalayas. However, the entire XVII Corps, with its headquarters at Panagarh in West Bengal, will only be fully raised with 90,274 troops at a cost of ₹646.7 billion (equivalent to ₹940 billion or US$10 billion in 2026) by 2018–19. With units spread across the 4,057 kilometres (2,521 mi) Line of Actual Control (LAC) from Ladakh to Arunachal Pradesh, the corps will have two high-altitude infantry divisions (59 Div at Panagarh and 72 Div at Pathankot) with their integral units, two independent infantry brigades, two armoured brigades and the like. It will include 30 new infantry battalions and two Para-Special Forces battalions. In other words, it will have "rapid reaction force" capability to launch a counter-offensive into Tibet Autonomous Region (TAR) in the event of any Chinese attack.

=== Army Aviation Corps ===
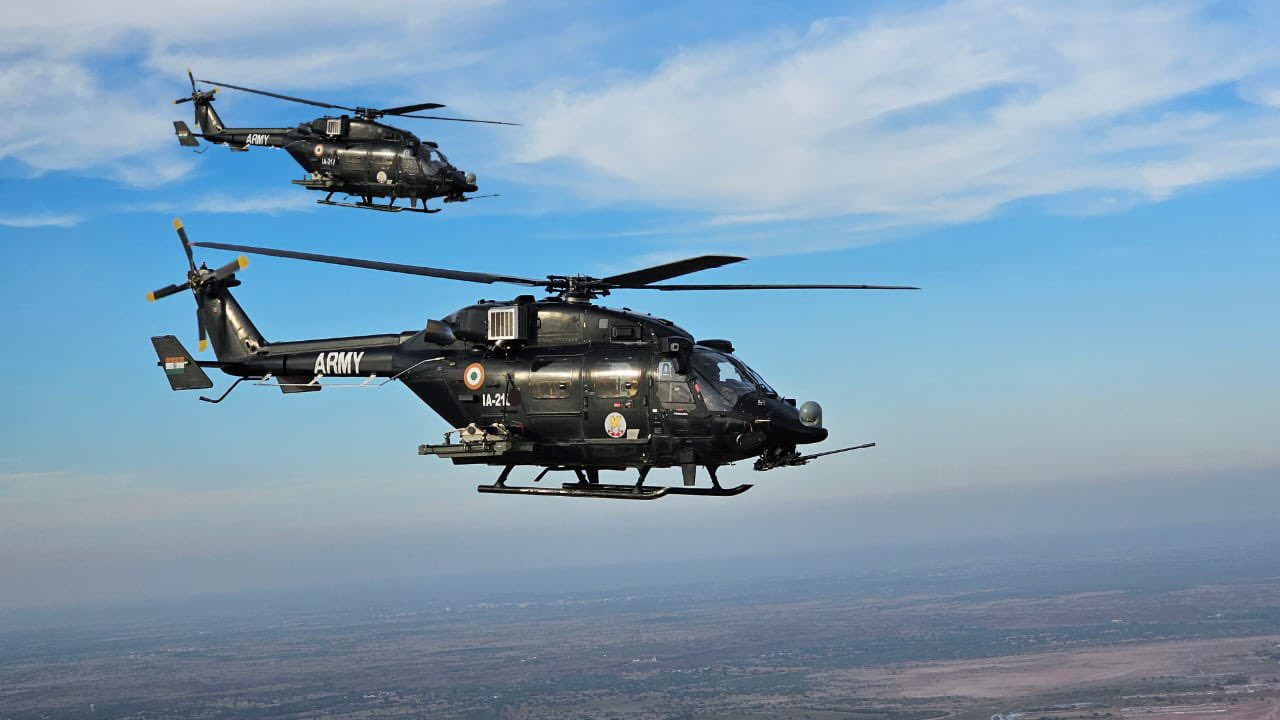
Indian Army's HAL Rudra helicopter's.

The Army Aviation Corps is another vital part of the Indian Army, formed on 1 November 1986. The army aviation pilots are drawn from other combat arms, including artillery officers, to form a composite third-dimensional force for an integrated battle. IAF operates and flies attack Helicopters like the Mil Mi-25/Mi-35, which are owned and administered by the Indian Air Force, but under the operational control of the Army, and play a major role in supporting the armoured columns and infantry. Apart from the attack role, helicopters like the HAL Chetak, HAL Cheetah, and HAL Dhruv provide logistical support for the Indian Army in remote and inaccessible areas, especially the Siachen Glacier. To equip the Army Aviation Corps, a procurement process for 197 light utility helicopters (LUH) is ongoing, of which 64 will be used in the Army Aviation Corps to replace the Cheetak and Cheetah Helicopters. HAL has obtained a firm order to deliver 114 HAL Light Combat Helicopters to the Indian Army.

=== Modernisation ===
==== Mechanised forces ====
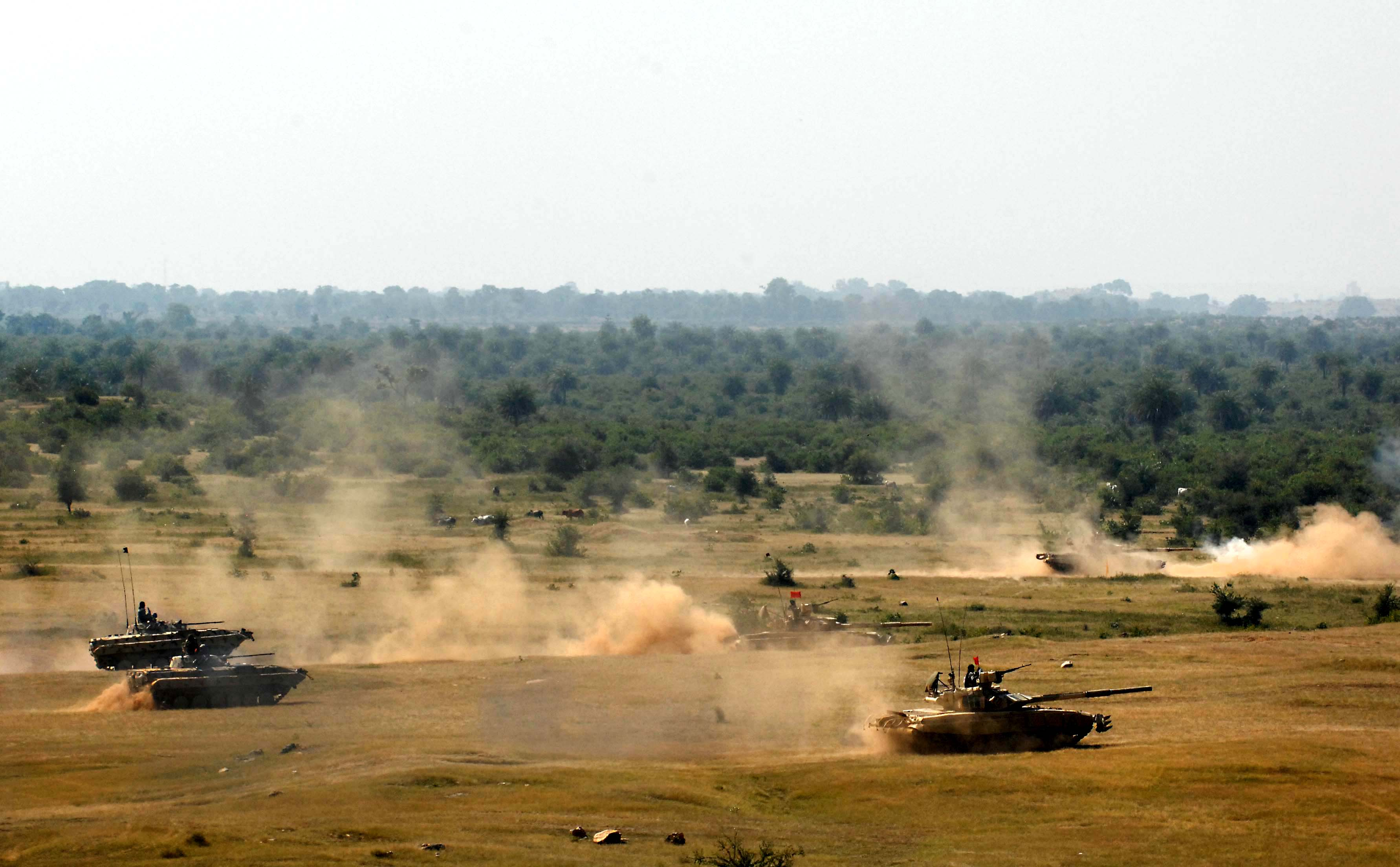
Indian Army's tanks and infantry vehicles during an exercise.

India is reorganising its mechanised forces to achieve strategic mobility and high-volume firepower for rapid thrusts into enemy territory. At present, the Indian army has severe deficiencies in its artillery (particularly self-propelled guns) and ammunition stocks, not to mention the inability of some of its modern tanks to operate in the heat and dust of the desert regions around the international border. India proposes to progressively induct as many as 248 Arjun MBT and to develop and induct the Arjun MK-II variant, 1,657 Russian-origin T-90S main-battle tanks, apart from the ongoing upgrade of its T-72 fleet. Arjun MK-II trials had already begun in August 2013. The improved features of the MK-II version of Arjun are night vision capabilities with a thermal imaging system for detecting all kinds of missiles, Explosive Reactive Armour (ERA), mine ploughs, the ability to fire anti-tank missiles with its 120 mm main gun, an Advanced Air Defence gun capable of shooting down helicopters with a 360-degree coverage, Automatic Target Tracking (ATT) lending a greater accuracy when it comes to moving targets and superior Laser Warning and Control systems. The Indian Army will upgrade its entire Boyevaya Mashina Pekhoty-2 (BMP-2)/2K infantry combat vehicle (ICV) fleet to enhance its ability to address operational requirements. Upgrades include integration of the latest generation fire control system, twin missile launchers and commander's thermal imaging panoramic sights, anti- tank guided missiles, as well as automatic grenade launchers.

==== Artillery ====
Under the Field Artillery Rationalisation Plan, the army plans to procure 3000 to 4000 pieces of artillery at a cost of US$3,000,000,000 (equivalent to $4,146,428,571 in 2025). This includes purchasing 1580 towed, 814 mounted, 180 self-propelled wheeled, 100 self-propelled tracked, and 145 ultra-light 155 mm/52 calibre artillery guns. After three years of searching and negotiations, India ordered M777 155 mm howitzers from the USA in September 2013.

To lend greater firepower support to the Mechanized infantry, DRDO has developed the Pinaka multiple rocket launcher. The system has a maximum range of 39–40 kilometres (24–25 mi) and can fire a salvo of 12 HE rockets in 44 seconds, neutralising a target area of 3.9 square kilometres (1.5 mi^{2}). The system is mounted on a Tatra truck for mobility. Pinaka saw service during the Kargil War, where it was successful in neutralising enemy positions on the mountain tops. It has since been inducted into the Indian Army in large numbers.

==== Infantry ====
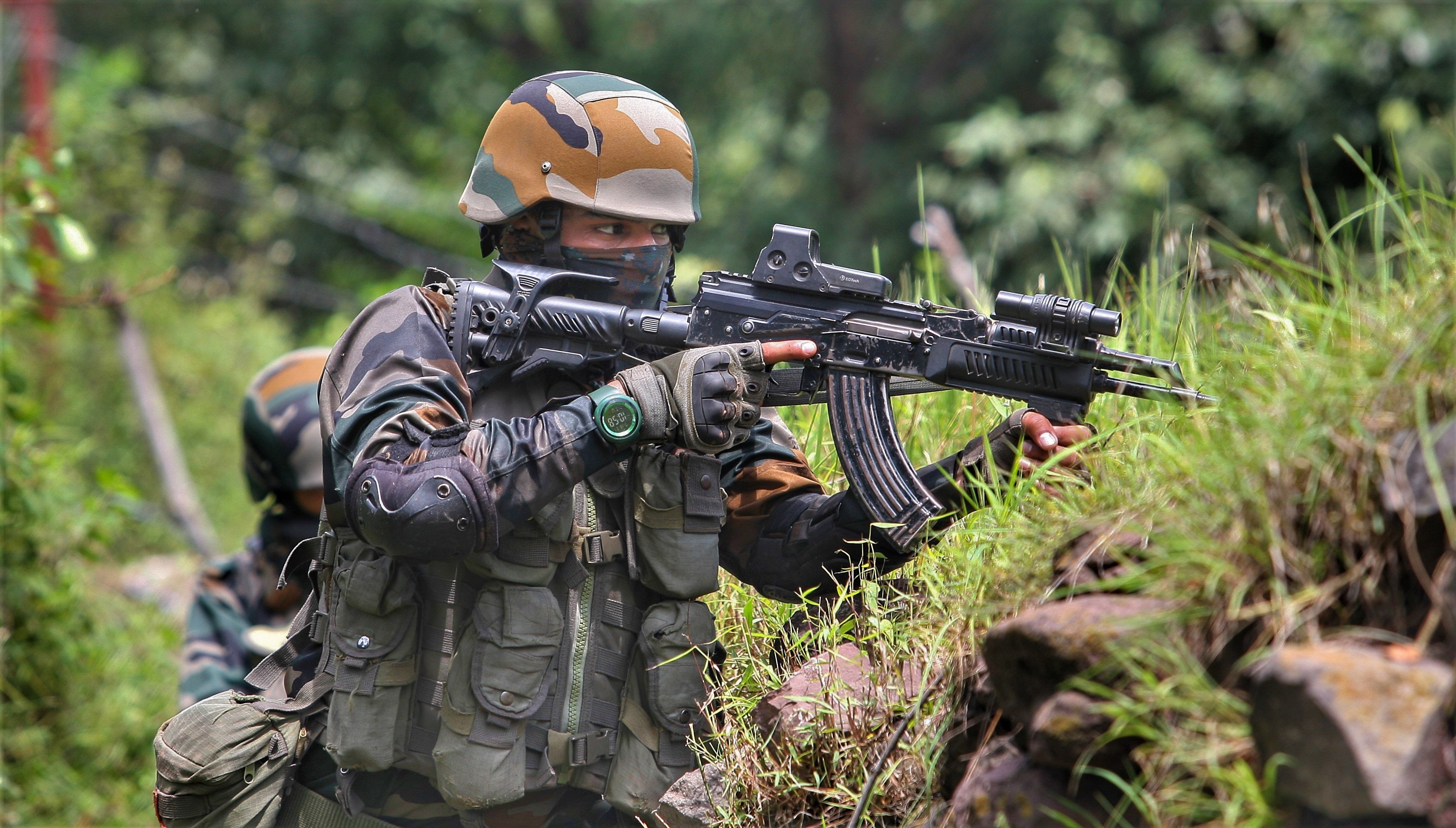
Indian Army soldier from White Knight Corps, 2021.

The Indian Army has also embarked on an infantry modernisation programme known as Futuristic Infantry Soldier As a System (F-INSAS). The infantry soldiers will be equipped with modular weapon systems that will have multiple functions. The core systems include bullet proof helmet and a visor. The bulletproof helmet is an integrated assembly equipped with helmet mounted flashlight, thermal sensors, a night vision device, a miniature computer, and audio headsets. The personal clothing of the soldier of the future would be lightweight with a bulletproof jacket. The futuristic jacket would be waterproof, yet it would be able to breathe. The new attire will enable the troops to carry extra loads and resist the impact of nuclear, chemical, and biological warfare. The new uniform will have vests with sensors to monitor the soldier's health parameters and to provide quick medical relief. The weapons sub-system is built around a multi-calibre individual weapon system with the fourth calibre attached to a grenade launcher. These include a 5.56 mm, a 7.62 mm, and a new 6.8 mm under development for the first time in India.

In November 2013, the Indian Army moved a step closer to the battlefield of the future, where command networks know the precise location of every soldier and weapon, with whom generals can exchange reports, photos, data, and verbal and written communications. Army headquarters called in 14 Indian companies and issued them an expression of interest (EoI) for developing a Battlefield Management System (BMS). The BMS will integrate combat units – armoured, artillery, and infantry regiments, infantry battalions, helicopter flights, etc. – into a digital network that will link together all components of the future battlefield. While precise costs are still unclear, vendors competing for the contract say the army expects to pay about Rs 40,000 crore for developing and manufacturing the BMS. However, in 2015, the Indian Army decided to replace the F-INSAS program in favour of two separate projects. The new program will have two components: one arming the modern infantry soldier with the best available assault rifle, carbines, and personal equipment such as the helmet and bulletproof vests, and the second part is the Battlefield Management Systems (BMS).

== Indian Navy ==
The Indian Navy is the naval branch of the Indian armed forces. With more than 142,000 personnel in total, including 7,000 personnel of the Indian Naval Air Arm, 1,200 Marine Commandos (MARCOS) and 1,000 personnel of the Sagar Prahari Bal. The Indian Navy is one of the world's largest naval forces and developed into a blue water navy. The Indian Navy has a large operational fleet of total 294 vessels consisting of 2 aircraft carriers, 1 amphibious transport dock, 9 Landing ship tanks, 12 destroyers, 12 frigates, 2 nuclear-powered attack submarine, 17 conventionally powered attack submarines, 18 corvettes, 6 mine countermeasure vessels, 4 fleet tankers and 137 patrol vessels.

=== Ships ===
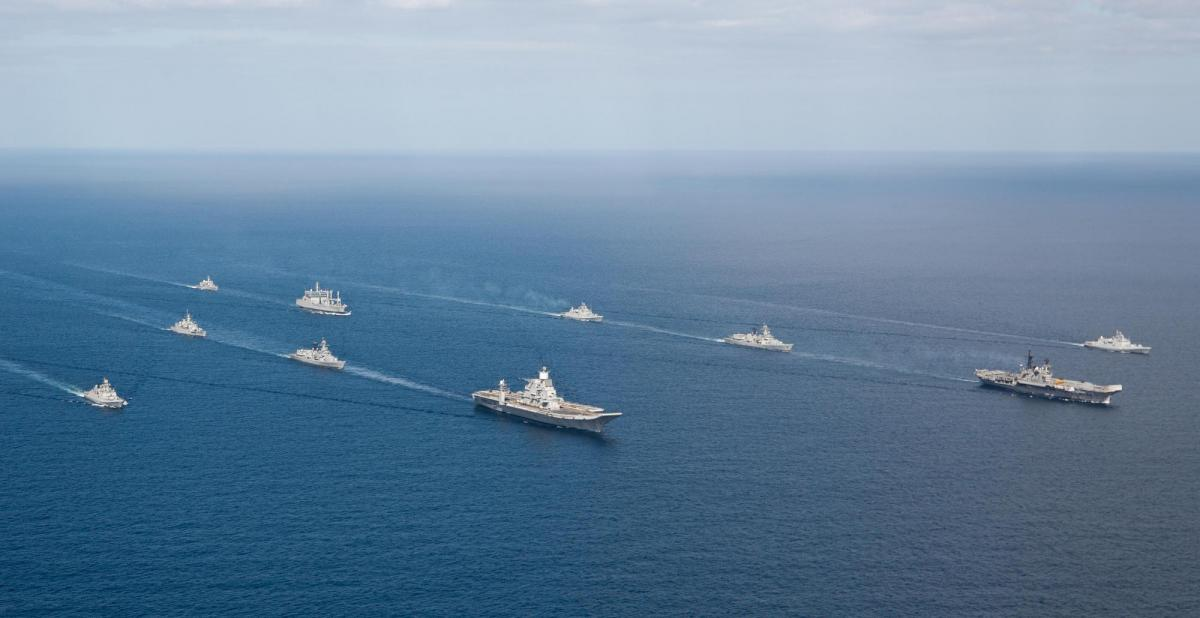
Indian Navy ships in transit led by aircraft carriers INS Vikramaditya & INS Vikrant (2013)

The Indian navy operates two aircraft carriers- the first is the INS Vikramaditya, a modified Kiev-class ship, and the indigenous INS Vikrant (2013). The navy also operates one Visakhapatnam-class, three Kolkata-class, three Delhi-class and three Rajput-class guided-missile destroyers. The Rajput-class destroyers will be replaced in the near future by the next-generation Visakhapatnam class (Project 15B destroyers). In addition to destroyers, the navy operates several classes of frigates, such as three Shivalik (Project 17 class) and six Talwar-class frigates. Seven additional Nilgiri-class (Project 17A-class) frigates are on order. The older Brahmaputra-class frigates will be replaced systematically one by one as the new classes of frigates are brought into service over the next decade. Smaller littoral zone combatants in service are in the form of corvettes, of which the Indian Navy operates the Kamorta, Kora, Khukri, Veer, and Abhay classes. Replenishment tankers such as the Jyoti-class tanker, the Aditya class, and the new Deepak-class fleet tankers help improve the navy's endurance at sea. These tankers will be the mainstay of the replenishment fleet until the first half of the 21st century.

=== Submarines ===
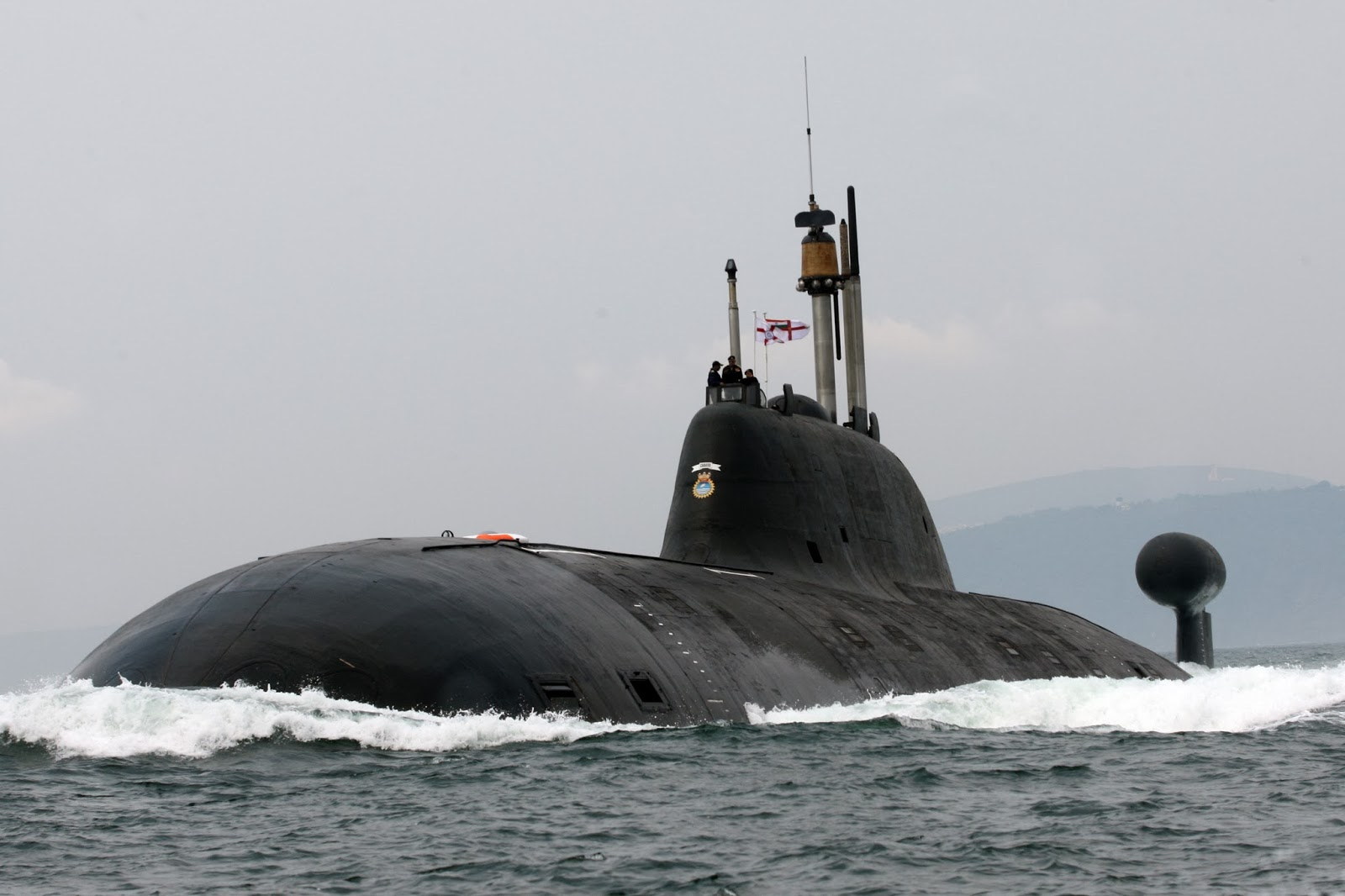
INS Chakra is India's nuclear-powered attack submarine.

The Indian Navy operates a sizeable fleet of Sindhughosh (Russian Kilo-class design) and Shishumar (German Type 209/1500 design)-class submarines. A nuclear-powered attack submarine INS Chakra has been leased from Russia. India is completing the construction of six Scorpène-class submarines at Mazagon Dockyards Limited (MDL), in Mumbai, under technology transfer from French firm DCNS. The new submarines feature air-independent propulsion and started joining the navy towards the end of 2017; four were in service by the end of 2021. Designed for coastal defence against underwater threats, the 1,750-tonne submarine-submarine-killer (SSK) Scorpène is 67 metres (219 ft 10 in) in length and can dive to a depth of 300 metres (980 ft). According to French naval officials, the submarine can stay at sea for 45 days with a crew of 31. The standard version has six torpedo tubes and anti-ship missile launchers. Another ambitious project in this regard is the nuclear-powered ballistic missile submarine manufacture programme – Arihant class.

=== Weapons systems ===
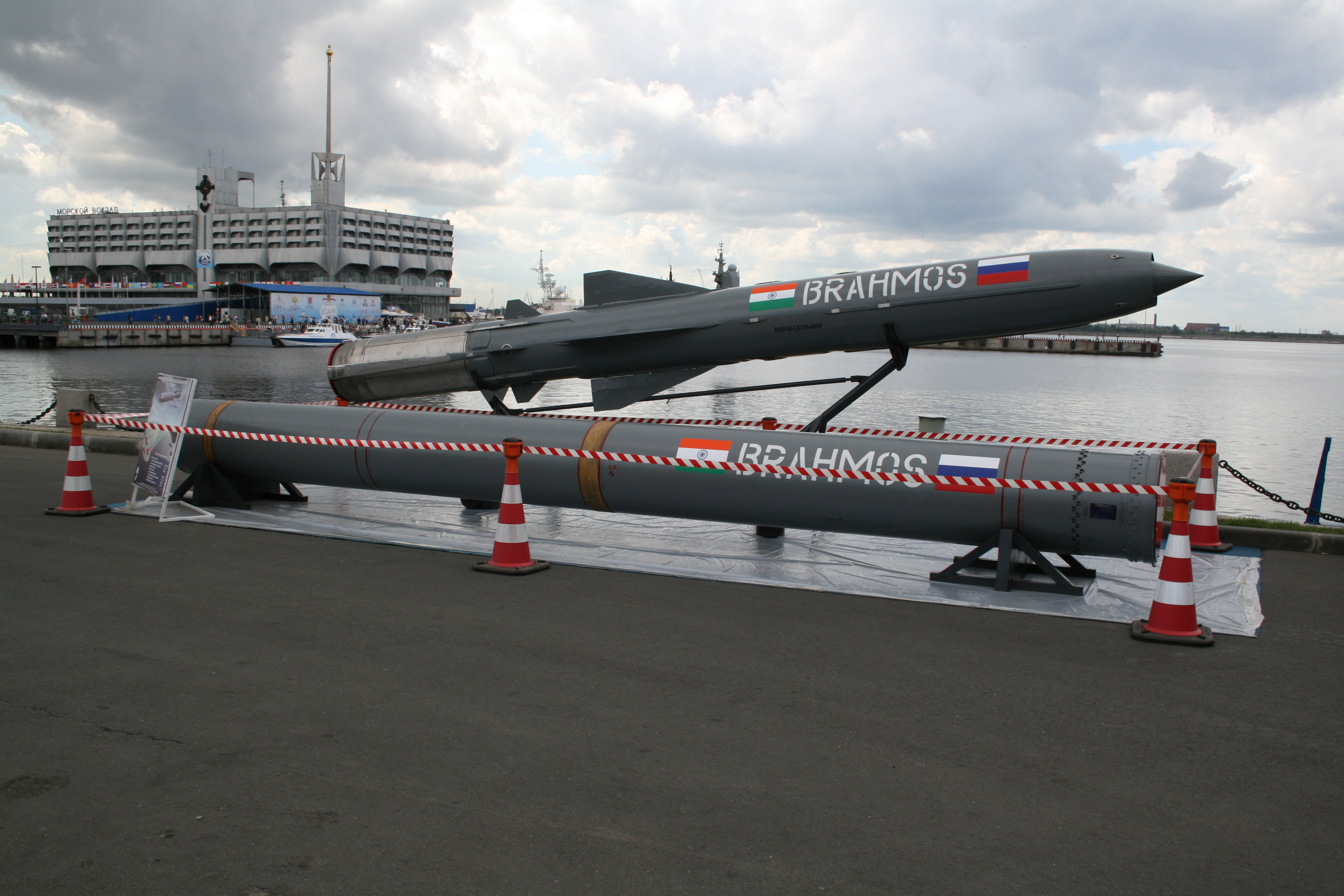
The Indian Navy's BrahMos supersonic anti-ship cruise missile.

In the category of weapon systems, the Indian Navy operates K Missile family submarine launched ballistic missiles, the Prithvi-III ballistic ship-launched missile, and several land-attack cruise/Anti-ship missiles such as BrahMos Supersonic Cruise Missile, 3M-54E/3M-14E Klub Anti-Ship/Land Attack Cruise Missile (SS-N-27 Sizzler), Kh-35 (SS-N-25 SwitchBlade), P-20 (SS-N-2D Styx), Sea Eagle missile and Gabriel. Nirbhay long-range subsonic cruise missile and BrahMos Hypersonic Cruise Missile are in development. India has also fitted its P-8I Neptune reconnaissance aircraft with all-weather, active-rader-homing, over-the-horizon AGM-84L Harpoon Block II Missiles and Mk 54 All-Up-Round Lightweight Torpedoes. Indian warships' primary air-defence shield is provided by Barak-1 SAM, while an advanced version Barak-8, developed in collaboration with Israel, has entered service. India's next-generation Scorpène-class submarines will be armed with the Exocet anti-ship missile system. Among indigenous missiles, a ship-launched version of Prithvi-II is called the Dhanush, which has a range of 350 kilometres (220 mi) and can carry a nuclear warhead.

=== Naval Air Arm ===
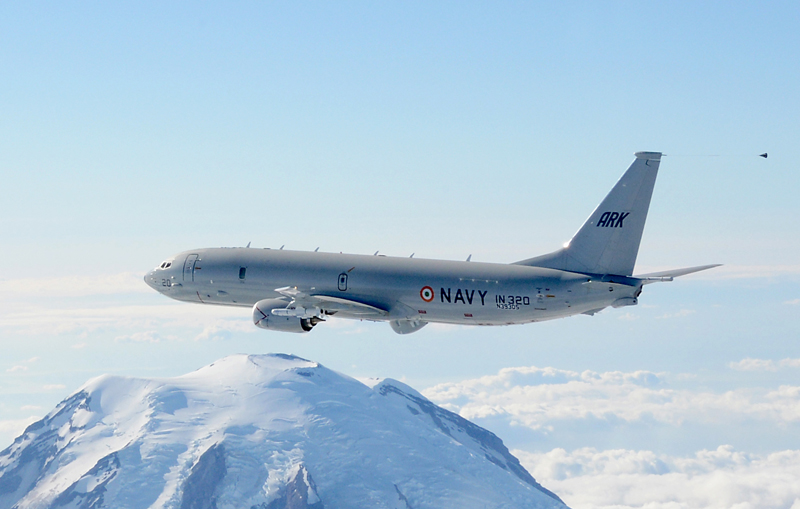
An Indian Navy P-8I Neptune anti-submarine warfare aircraft.

The Indian Naval Air Arm is a branch of the Indian Navy that is tasked to provide an aircraft carrier-based strike capability, fleet air defence, maritime reconnaissance, and anti-submarine warfare. Flag Officer Naval Aviation (FONA) at Goa directs the field operations of the air arm. Naval Air Arm operates eight Tu-142 aircraft, which entered service in 1988. Upgrading of the aircraft is taking place, which helps to extend the service life of the aircraft by sixteen years. The BAE Sea Harrier operates from the INS Viraat. The BAE Sea Harrier FRS Mk. 51 / T Mk. 60 flies with the INAS 300 and INAS 552 squadrons of the Indian Navy. The Mikoyan MiG-29K will be deployed aboard INS Vikramaditya. The Indian Navy operates five Il-38 planes. They are being upgraded to use the Sea Dragon suite. Used principally for anti-submarine warfare (ASW) and search and rescue roles, the helicopter fleet of Westland Sea King and the Sikorsky SH-3 Sea King operate from INS Garuda (Kochi) as well as INS Kunjali-II (Mumbai) air stations. 56 more naval utility helicopters are planned to be inducted from 2016. These will be used for surveillance, anti-submarine warfare, electronic intelligence gathering, and search and rescue operations. The helicopters will be equipped with 70 mm rocket launchers, 12.7 mm guns, lightweight torpedoes, and depth charges. The Indian Navy will also continue to procure HAL Dhruv as a multi-role utility platform. In the long-range maritime reconnaissance (LRMR) role, the navy uses Boeing P-8I Neptune and has issued a global tender for nine medium-range maritime reconnaissance (MRMR) aircraft for coastal defence.

=== Defence satellite ===
India's first exclusive defence satellite GSAT-7 was successfully launched by European space consortium Arianespace's Ariane 5 rocket from Kourou spaceport in French Guiana in August 2013, giving a major push to the country's maritime security. The Indian Navy is the user of the multi-band, home-built communication spacecraft, which is operational. GSAT-7 was designed and developed by the Indian Space Research Organisation (ISRO) and is expected to operate for seven years in its orbital slot at 74 degrees east, providing UHF, S-band, C-band and Ku-band relay capacity. Its Ku-band capacity is expected to provide a high-density data transmission facility both for voice and video. This satellite has been provided with additional power to communicate with smaller and mobile (not necessarily land-based) terminals. This dedicated satellite is expected to provide the Indian Navy with an approximately 3,500–4,000 kilometres (2,200–2,500 mi) footprint over the Indian Ocean region, and over both the Arabian Sea and the Bay of Bengal region, and enable real-time networking of all its operational assets in the water (and land). It will help the Navy to operate in a network-centric atmosphere.

=== Exercises ===
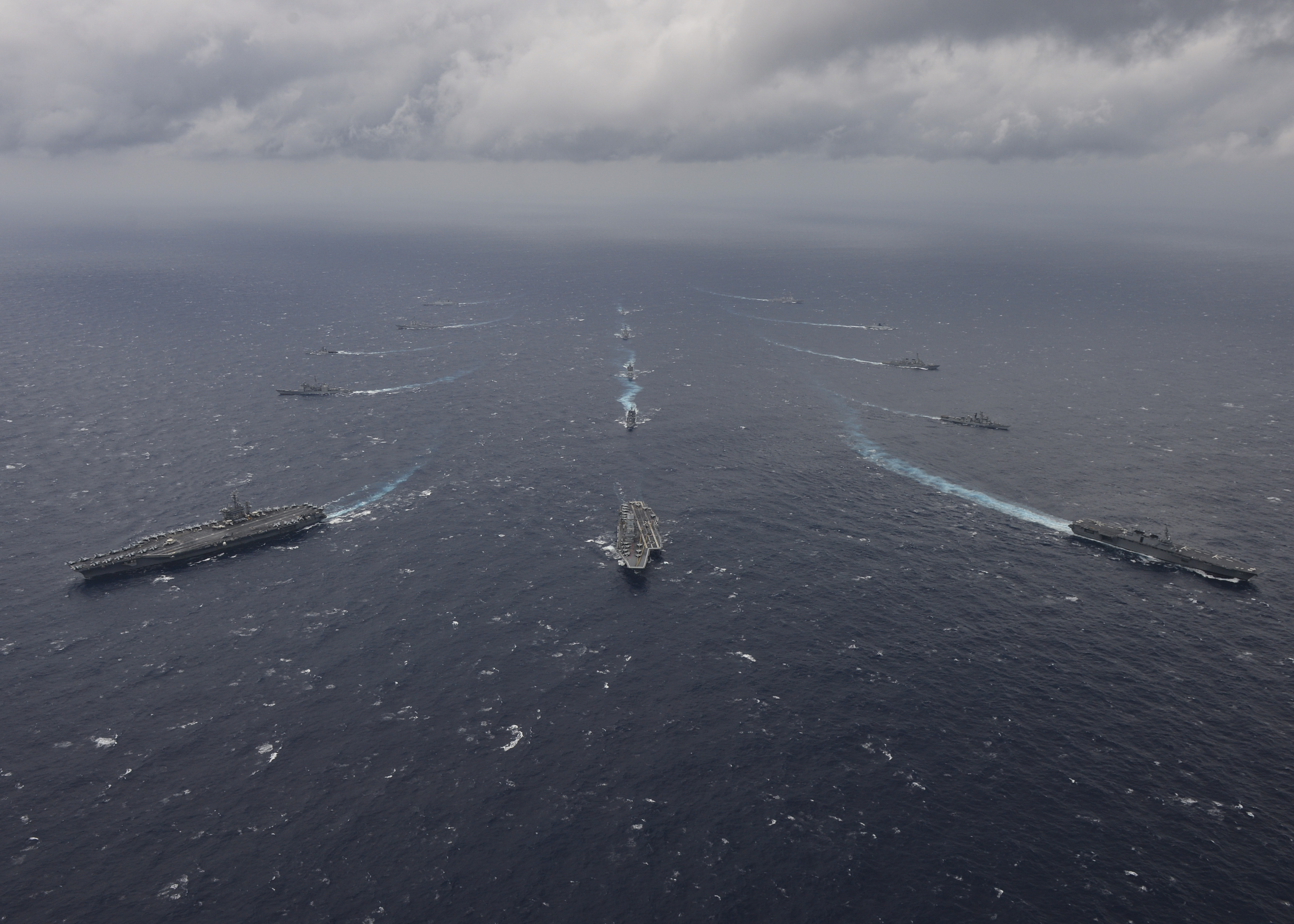
Ships from the Indian navy, Japan Maritime Self-Defense Force, and United States Navy during exercise Malabar 2017.

India often conducts naval exercises with other friendly countries designed to increase naval interoperability and also to strengthen cooperative security relationships. Some exercises take place annually like: the Varuna with the French Navy, Konkan with the Royal Navy, Indra with Russian Navy, Malabar with the US and Japan navies, Simbex with the Republic of Singapore Navy and IBSAMAR with the Brasil and South African navies. In 2007, the Indian Navy conducted a naval exercise with the Japan Maritime Self-Defence Force and the US Navy in the Pacific and also signed an agreement with Japan in October 2008 for joint naval patrolling in the Asia-Pacific region. India has also held naval exercises with Vietnam, the Philippines, and New Zealand. In 2007, India and South Korea decided to conduct annual naval exercises, and India participated in the South Korean international fleet review. In addition, the Indian Navy will also be increasing naval co-operation with other allies, particularly with Germany, and Arab states of the Persian Gulf including Kuwait, Oman, Bahrain and Saudi Arabia. Indian Navy also took part in the world's largest naval exercise/war-game RIMPAC 2014 along with 22 other nations and has since taken part in RIMPAC each year.

=== Modernisation ===
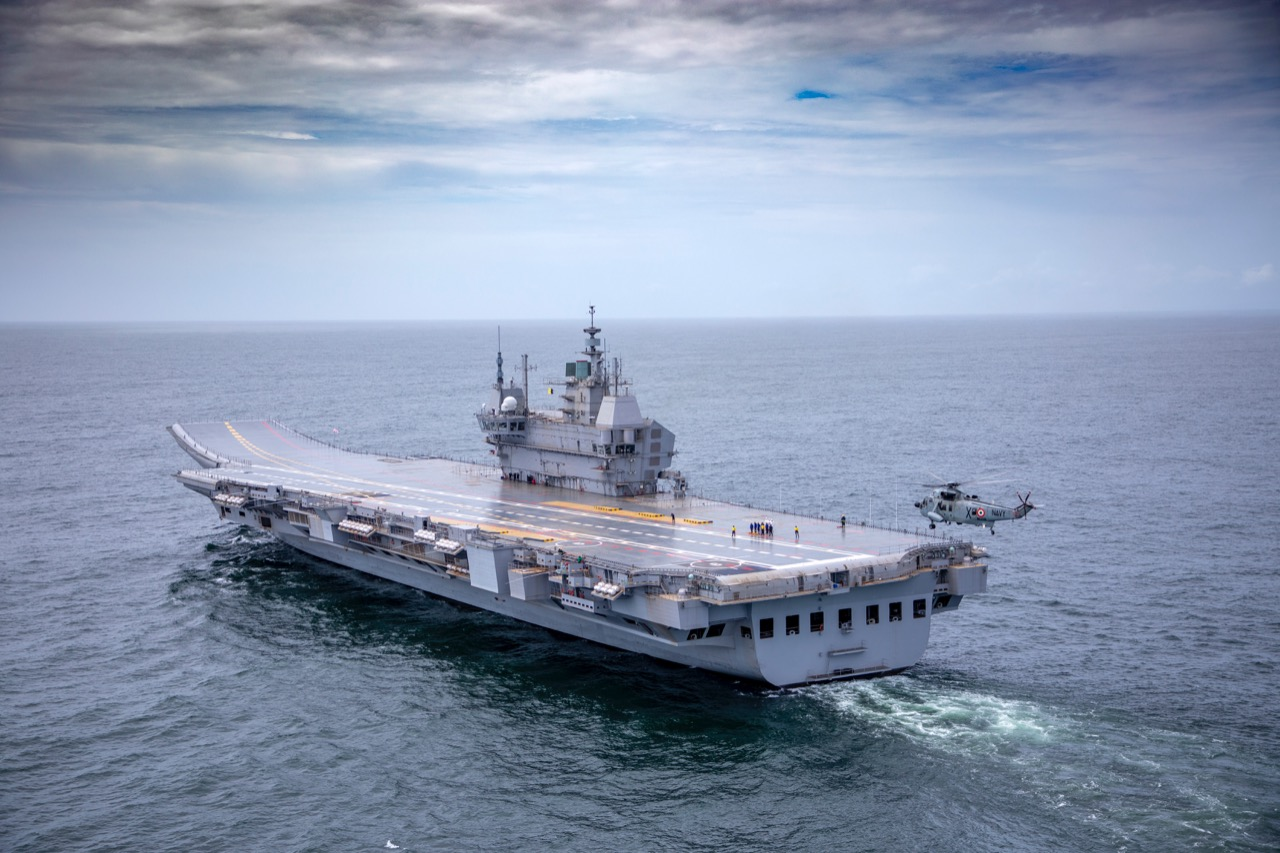
INS Vikrant is the Indian Navy's first indigenous aircraft carrier, shown here during its maiden sea trials, August 2021.

In recent years, the Indian Navy has undergone modernisation and expansion with the intention of countering growing Chinese maritime power in the Indian Ocean and reaching the status of a recognised blue-water navy. New equipment programmes include: the lease of a nuclear-powered submarine INS Chakra from Russia, the ex-Soviet carrier INS Vikramaditya and the first of the indigenously built Arihant-class ballistic missile submarines by 2016, the first of the Scorpène-class submarines by 2016 and the indigenously built aircraft carrier INS Vikrant by 2018. The plan in the near future is to have two aircraft carriers at sea at all times, with a third docked up in maintenance. Other programmes include the Talwar and Shivalik frigates and the Kolkata-class destroyers, all of which will be equipped with the BrahMos cruise missile. In a significant step towards India's pursuit for self-reliance in indigenous warship building, four anti-submarine Kamorta-class stealth corvettes with features such as an X Form Hull and inclined sides for low radar cross-section, infra-red suppression, and acoustic quieting systems are being built for the Indian Navy.

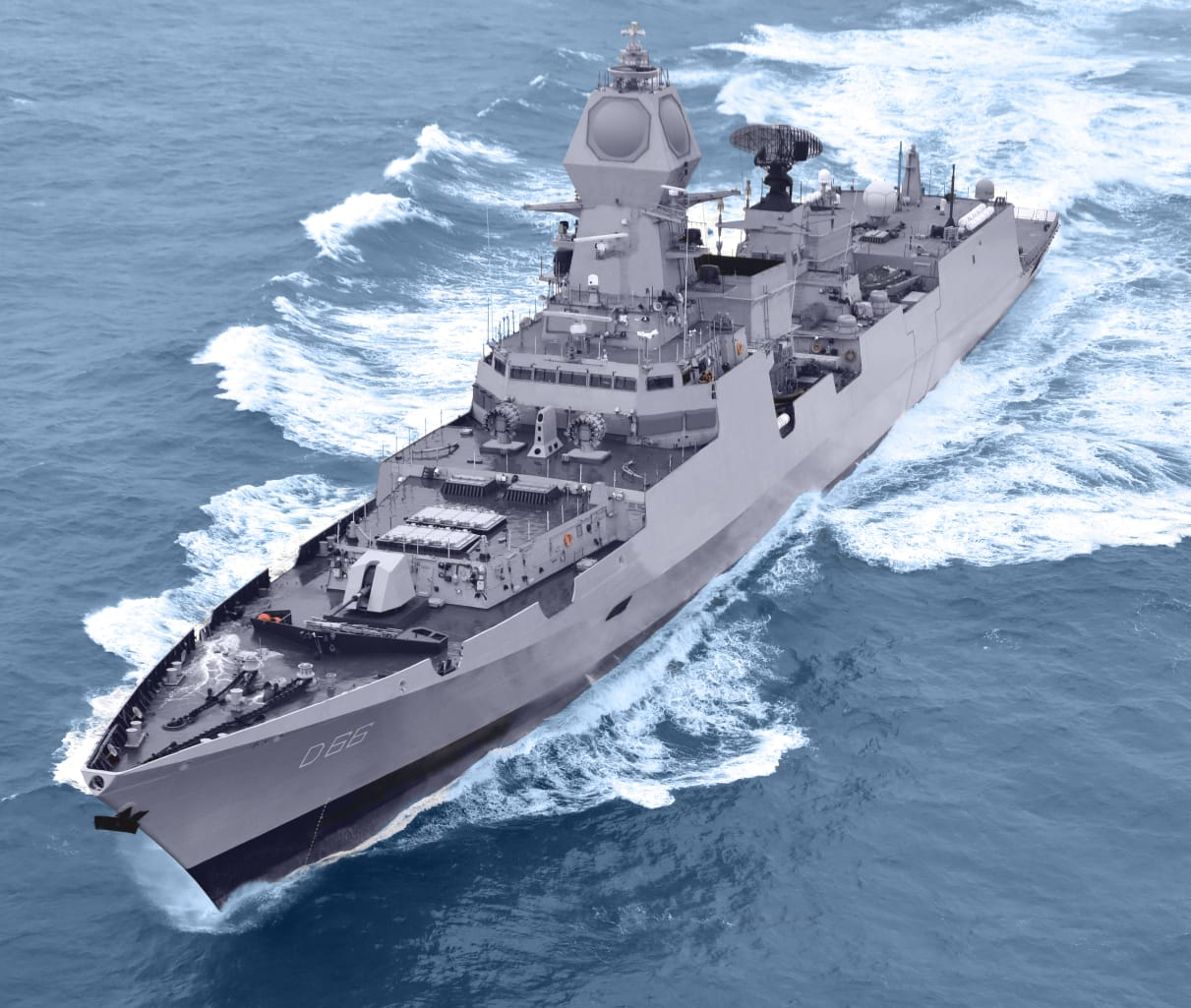
Guided missile destroyer D66.

Recent induction of the attack submarine INS Chakra, and the development of INS Arihant, make the Indian Navy one of six navies worldwide capable of building and operating nuclear-powered submarines. (Others include: China, France, Russia, the United Kingdom, and the United States.) India also launched a 37,500-ton indigenous aircraft carrier INS Vikrant in August 2013 in its bid to join a select group of nations – the United States, the United Kingdom, Russia, and France – capable of building such warships. It will undergo extensive tests in the next few years before it is commissioned into the Navy. INS Vikrant is expected to carry MiG 29K fighters and light combat aircraft such as the HAL Tejas.

India is also set to become the first country to buy a military aircraft from Japan since World War II. India is expected to sign a deal for the purchase of six Utility Seaplane Mark 2 (US-2) amphibious aircraft when Prime Minister Narendra Modi visits Japan from 31 August to 3 September 2014. The 47-tonne US-2 aircraft does not require a long airstrip to take off or to land. It is capable of taking off from land and water (300 metres (330 yd)-stretch). It can carry loads of up to 18 tonnes and can be engaged in search and rescue operations. With a range of over 4,500 kilometres (2,800 mi) it can patrol areas 1,800 kilometres (1,100 mi) away and react to an emergency by landing 30 armed troops even in waves as high as 10 feet (3.0 m).

== Indian Air Force ==
The Indian Air Force is the air arm of the Indian armed forces. Its primary responsibility is to secure Indian airspace and to conduct aerial warfare during a conflict. It was officially established on 8 October 1932 as an auxiliary air force of the British Raj and the prefix Royal was added in 1945 in recognition of its services during World War II. After India achieved independence from the United Kingdom in 1947, the Royal Indian Air Force served the Dominion of India, with the prefix being dropped when India became a republic in 1950. The Indian Air Force plays a crucial role in securing Indian airspace and also in India's power projection in South Asia and the Indian Ocean. Therefore, modernising and expanding the Indian Air Force is a top priority for the Indian government. Over the years, the IAF has grown from a tactical force to one with transoceanic reach. The strategic reach emerges from the induction of Force Multipliers like Flight Refuelling Aircraft (FRA), Unmanned Aerial Vehicle (UAV), and credible strategic lift capabilities.

=== Aircraft ===
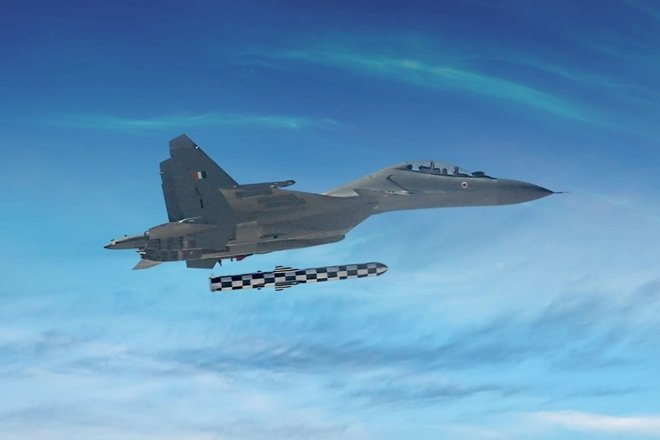
IAF Sukhoi Su-30MKI firing BrahMos-ER

Historically, the IAF has generally relied on Soviet, British, Israeli, and French military craft and technology to support its growth. IAF's primary air superiority fighter with the additional capability to conduct air-ground (strike) missions is Sukhoi Su-30MKI. The IAF has placed an order for a total of 272 Su-30MKIs, of which 205 are in service as of May 2015. The Mikoyan MiG-29 is a dedicated air superiority fighter, and constitutes a second line of defence after the Sukhoi Su-30MKI. At present, 66 MiG-29s are in service, all of which are being upgraded to the MiG-29UPG standard. The Dassault Mirage 2000 is the primary multirole fighter in service, and the IAF operates 49 Mirage 2000Hs, which are being upgraded to the Mirage 2000-5 MK2 standard. As part of the upgrade, the aircraft will also be equipped with MBDA's MICA family of medium-range missiles. To give the IAF fighters an edge in anti-ship and land attack roles, a smaller version of BrahMos missile is being developed to be integrated in Sukhoi Su-30MKI and is expected to be delivered to IAF by 2015.

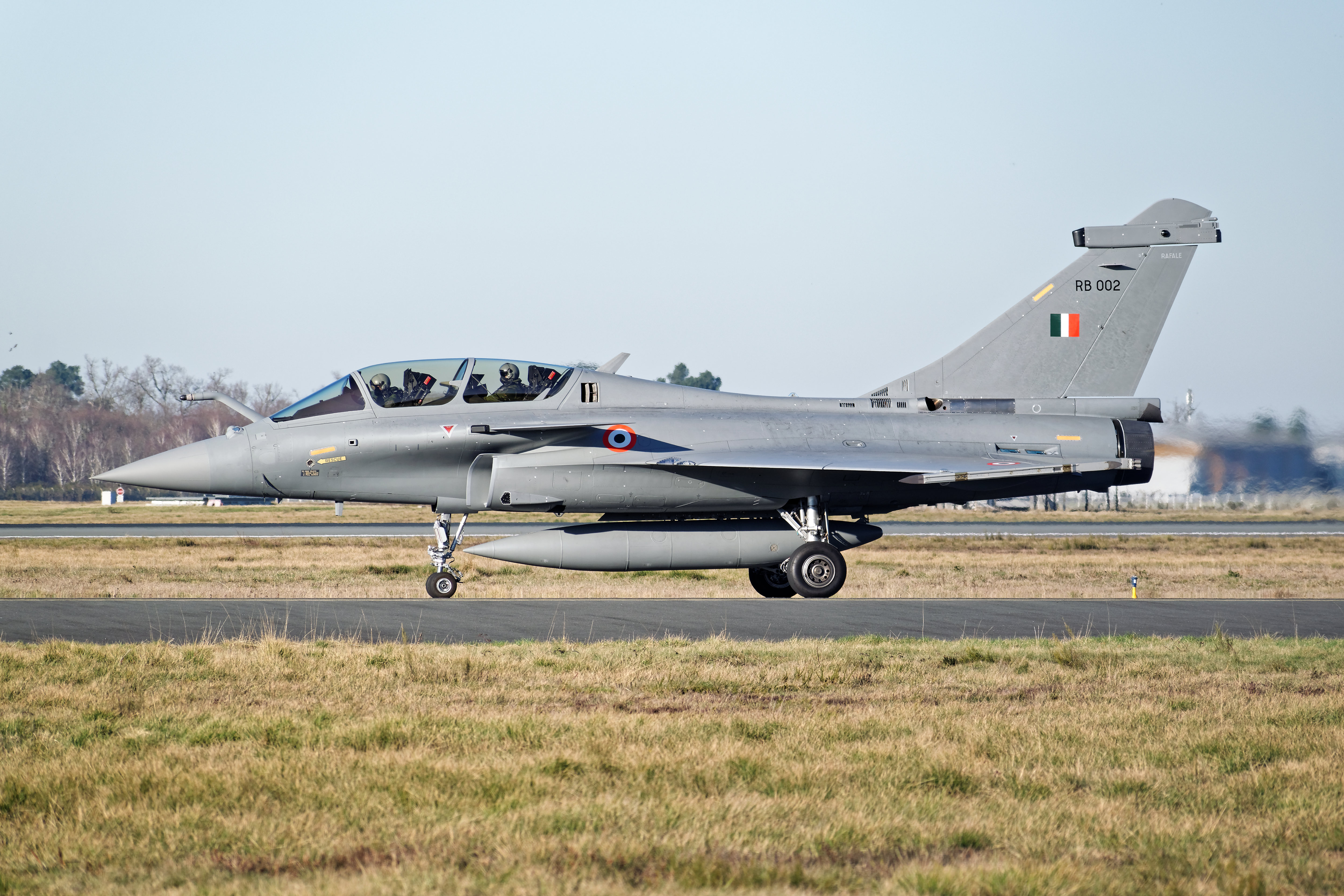
IAF Rafale at Bordeaux–Mérignac Airport, 6 February 2020

In the aerial refuelling (tanker) role, the IAF operates six Ilyushin Il-78MKIs. For strategic military transport operations, the IAF uses the Ilyushin Il-76, and has placed orders for 10 Boeing C-17 Globemaster III, four of which were delivered by November 2013. The C-130J Super-Hercules planes of the IAF are used by special forces for combined Army-Air Force operations. There are six C-130Js in service, and six more are planned to be procured. The Antonov An-32 serves as medium transport aircraft in the IAF.

As an airborne early warning system, the IAF operates the Israeli EL/W-2090 Phalcon Airborne Early Warning and Control System AEW&C. A total of three such systems are in service, with possible orders for two more. The DRDO AEW&CS is a project of India's DRDO to develop an AEW&C system for the Indian Air Force. The DRDO AEWACS programme aims to deliver three radar-equipped surveillance aircraft to the Indian Air Force. The aircraft platform selected was the Embraer ERJ 145. Three ERJ 145 were procured from Embraer for US$300 million, including the contracted modifications to the airframe. Probable delivery date for the first batch of three is 2015.

=== Network-centric warfare ===
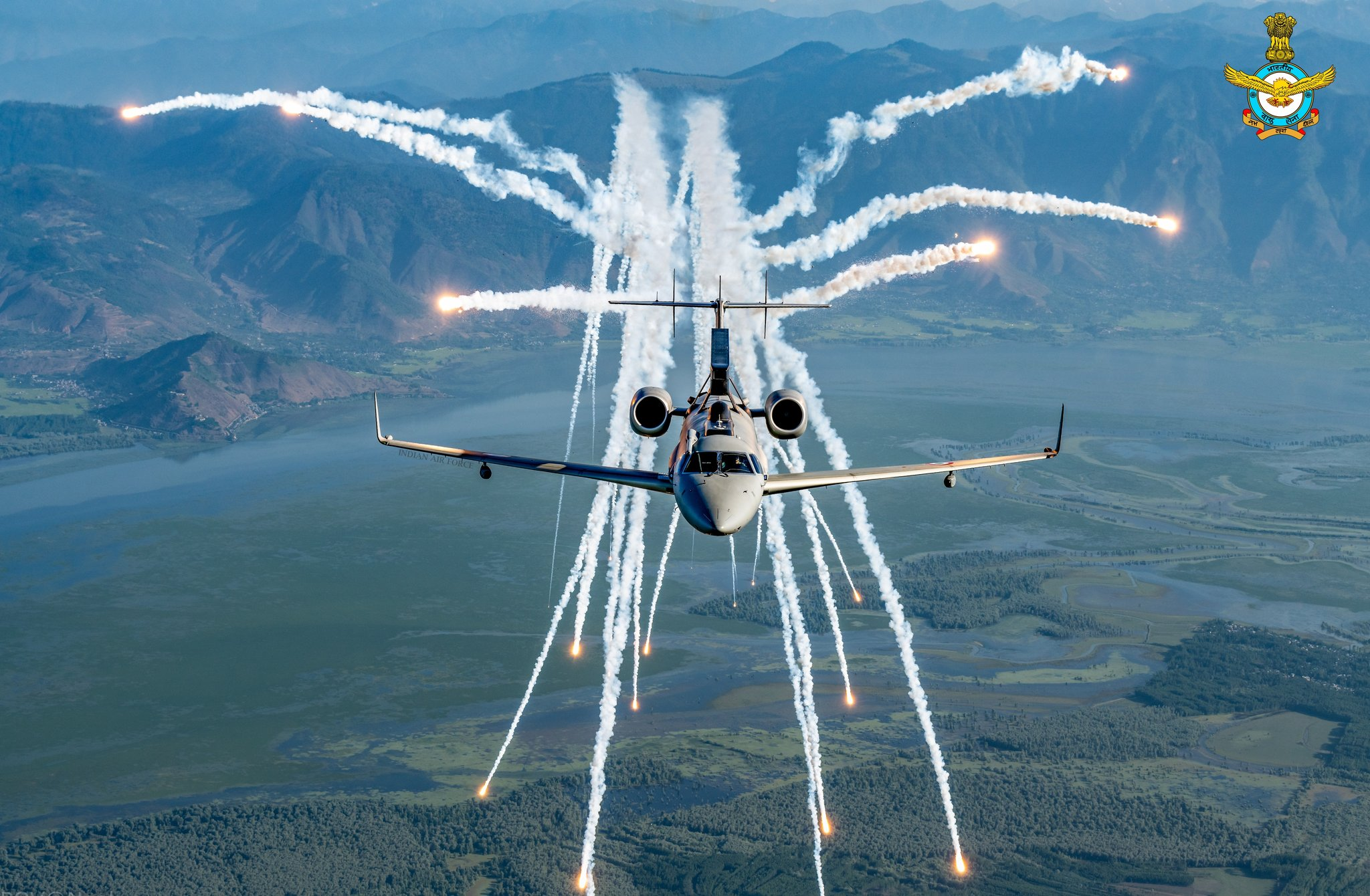
DRDO AEW&CS.

The Indian Air Force (IAF) made progress towards becoming a truly network-centric air force in 2010 with the integration of Air Force Network (AFNET), a reliable and robust digital information grid that enables accurate and faster response to enemy threats. The modern, state-of-the-art AFNET is a fully secure communication network, providing IAF a critical link among its command and control centre, sensors such as the Airborne Early Warning and Control Systems, and attack platforms such as fighter aircraft and missile launchers. Integrated Air Command and Control System (IACCS), an automated command and control system for Air Defence (AD) operations, will ride the AFNet backbone, integrating all ground-based and airborne sensors, AD weapon systems, and C2 nodes.

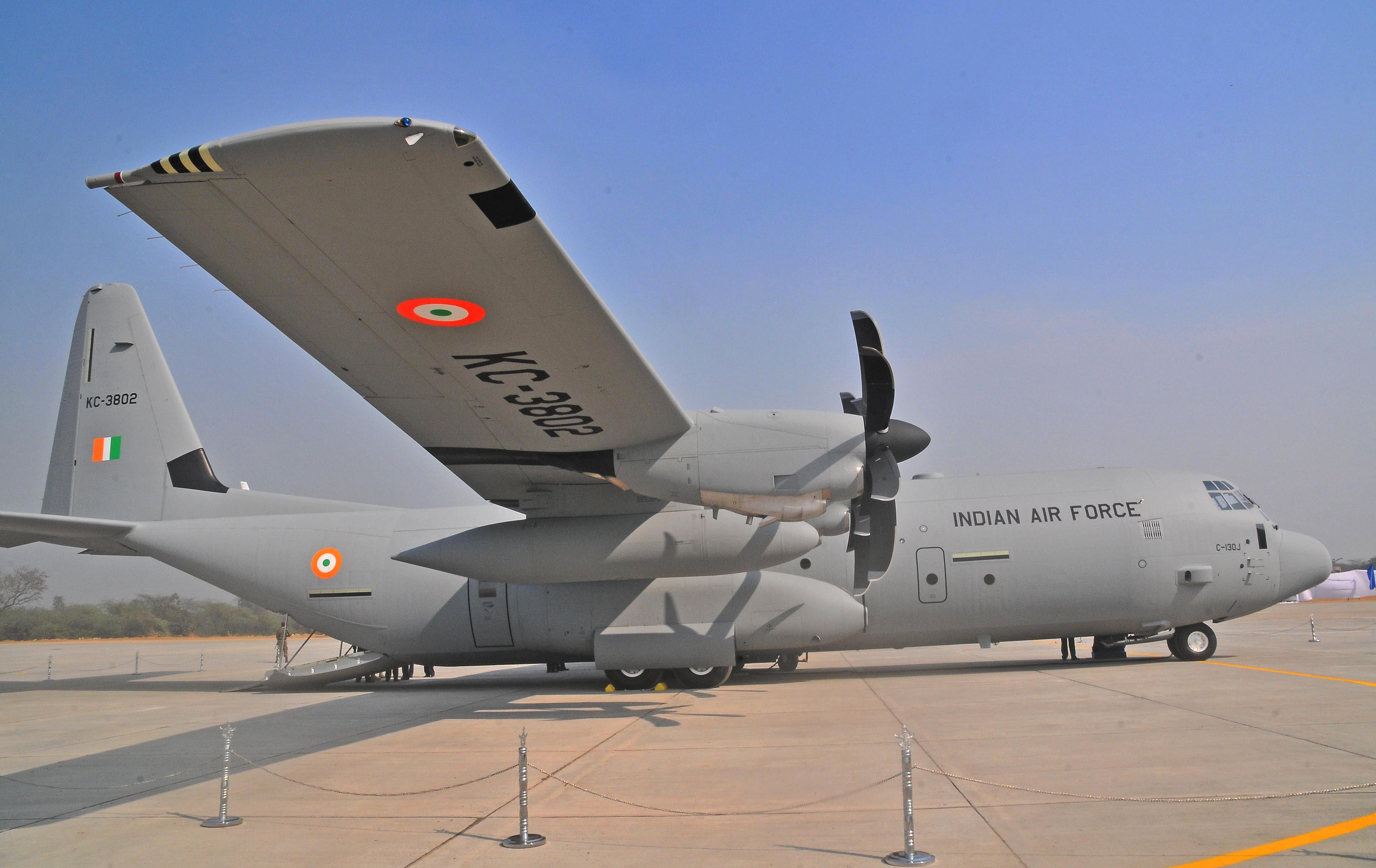
A C-130 J tactical transport aircraft.

Subsequent integration with other service networks and civil radars will provide an integrated Air Situation Picture to operators to carry out the Air Defence role. AFNet will prove to be an effective force multiplier for intelligence analysis, mission planning and control, post-mission feedback, and related activities like maintenance, logistics, and administration. A comprehensive design with multi-layer security precautions for "Defence in Depth" has been planned by incorporating encryption technologies, Intrusion Prevention Systems, to ensure the resistance of the IT system against information manipulation and eavesdropping.

In October 2013, IAF launched its own stand-alone ₹3 billion (US$34 million) cellular network, through which secure video calling and other information exchange facilities will be provided. The IAF also plans to issue around one hundred thousand mobile handsets to its personnel of the rank of sergeant and above to connect and provide secure 'end-point' connectivity to airborne forces deployed across the country. The captive network has been named 'Air Force Cellular'. While Phase I of the project will ensure mobile connectivity to all air combat units in the National Capital Region, its Phase II will cover the rest of the bases.

=== Modernisation ===
The Medium Multi-Role Combat Aircraft (MMRCA) competition, also known as the MRCA tender, was a competition to supply 126 multi-role combat aircraft to the Indian Air Force (IAF). The Defence Ministry has allocated ~ US$13 billion for the purchase of these aircraft, making it India's single largest defence deal. On 31 January 2012, it was announced that Dassault Rafale won the competition due to its lower life-cycle cost. However, the tender was cancelled in July 2015. The Indian Air Force (IAF) is also in the final stages of acquiring 22 Apache Longbow gunships, armed with Hellfire and Stinger missiles in a $1.2 billion contract and 15 heavy-lift Boeing CH Chinook helicopters. The IAF has initiated the process for acquisition of additional Mi-17 IV helicopters, heavy lift helicopters, Advanced Light Helicopter and Light Combat Helicopters. Among trainer aircraft, the Hawk Advanced Jet Trainer has been inducted, and the Intermediate Jet Trainer (IJT) would be acquired in the near future.

HAL Tejas firing Astra (missile)

In recent times, India has also manufactured its own aircraft, such as the HAL Tejas, a 4th-generation fighter, and the HAL Dhruv, a multi-role helicopter, which has been exported to several countries, including Israel, Burma, Nepal, and Ecuador. A weaponised version of Dhruv is called the HAL Rudra, which is armed with a high-velocity M621 20 mm cannon, long-range 70 mm rockets (8 km), air-to-air missiles (Mistral-II), and MAWS (missile approach warning system). Outcome of Kargil War highlighted the requirement of an attack helicopter specially made for such high-altitude operations. The HAL Light Combat Helicopter (LCH) is a multi-role combat helicopter being developed in India by Hindustan Aeronautics Limited (HAL) for use by the Indian Army and the Indian Air Force. The LCH is being designed to fit into an anti-infantry and anti-armour role and will be able to operate at high altitudes. LCH will be fitted with indigenous anti-tank missile Helina.

India also maintains unmanned aerial vehicle (UAV) squadrons (primarily Searcher-II and Heron from Israel) which can be used to carry out ground and aerial surveillance. India is also testing its own long-range Beyond Visual Range missile (BVR) which is an air-to-air missile named as Astra, and also building a Medium Altitude Long Endurance Unmanned Aerial Vehicle (UAV) called Rustom.

India is also in an ambitious collaboration programme with Russia to build fifth-generation fighter aircraft, called HAL/Sukhoi FGFA, which will be based on the Russian Sukhoi Su-57 fighter. Earlier in 2013, the two sides completed the preliminary design of the FGFA and are now negotiating a detailed design contract. Although there is no reliable information about the Su-57 and FGFA specifications yet, it is known from interviews with officials in the Russian Air Force that it will be stealthy, can supercruise, be outfitted with the next generation of air-to-air, air-to-surface, and air-to-ship missiles, and incorporate an AESA radar.

Joint co-development and co-production of Multi-role Transport Aircraft (MTA), by Russian partners and HAL, is being launched to meet the requirements of the Russian and Indian Air Forces. The aircraft will be designed for the roles of a 15–20 ton cargo/troop transport, paratrooping / airdrop of supplies, including Low Altitude Parachute Extraction System (LAPES) capability. It will be configured such that all types of cargo can be transported, and the aircraft will be capable of operating from semi-prepared runways. The MTA is expected to replace the Indian Air Force's ageing fleet of Antonov An-32 transport aircraft. The aircraft is expected to conduct its first flight by 2017, and to enter service by 2018.

To protect IAF assets on the ground, there has been a search for a short-range surface-to-air missile. India has begun deploying six Akash surface-to-air missile (SAM) squadrons in the northeast to deter Chinese jets, helicopters, and drones against any misadventure in the region. The IAF has started taking delivery of the six Akash missile squadrons, which can "neutralise" multiple targets at a 25 kilometres (16 mi) interception range in all weather conditions, earmarked for the eastern theatre. The IAF has already deployed the first two Akash squadrons at the Mirage-2000 base in Gwalior and the Sukhoi base in Pune.

== Indian Coast Guard ==
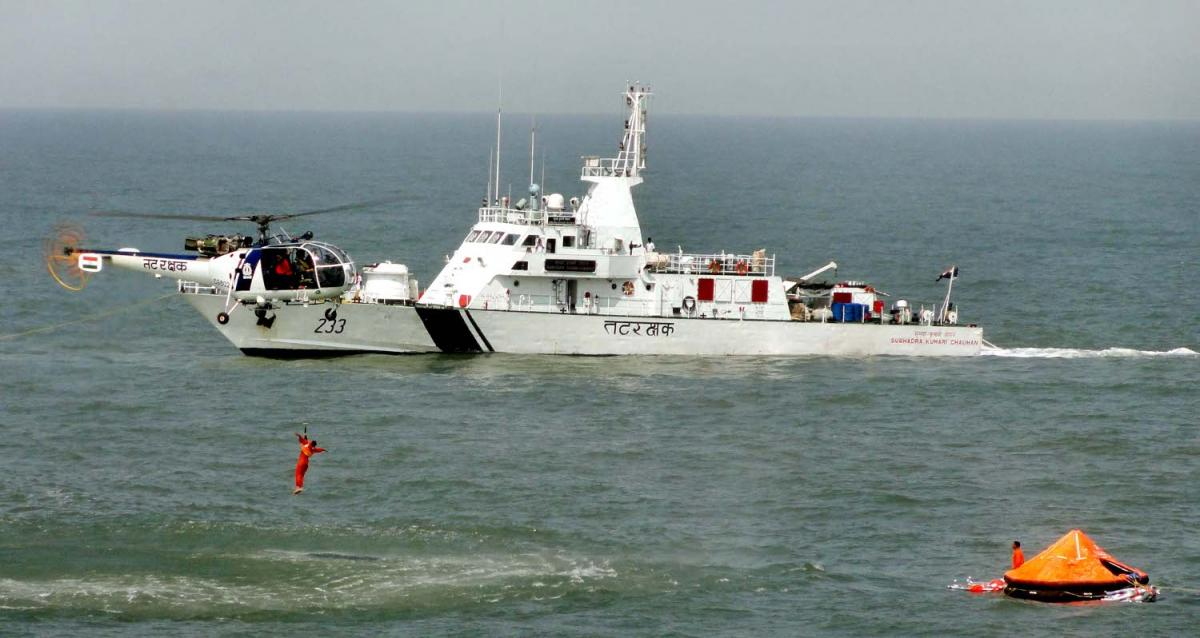
Indian Coast Guard (ICG) helicopter takes a survivor to an ICG ship during a mock drill.

The Indian Coast Guard (ICG) protects India's maritime interests and enforces maritime law, with jurisdiction over the territorial waters of India, including its contiguous zone and exclusive economic zone. The Indian Coast Guard was formally established on 18 August 1978 by the Coast Guard Act, 1978 of the Parliament of India as an independent Armed force of India. It operates under the Ministry of Defence.

The Coast Guard works in close co-operation with the Indian Navy, the Department of Fisheries, the Department of Revenue (Customs), and the Central and State police forces.

== Central Armed Police Forces ==
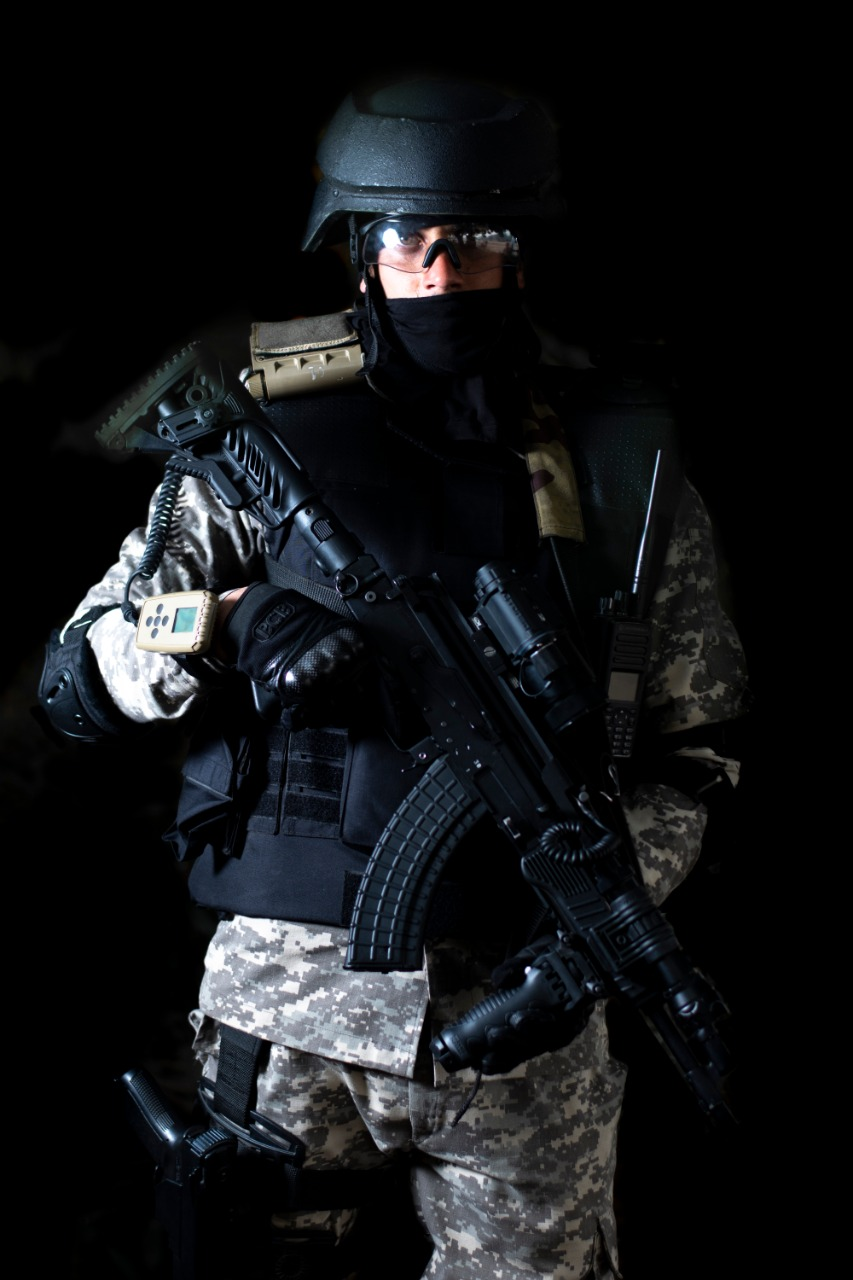
A CRPF QRT operator in full loadout

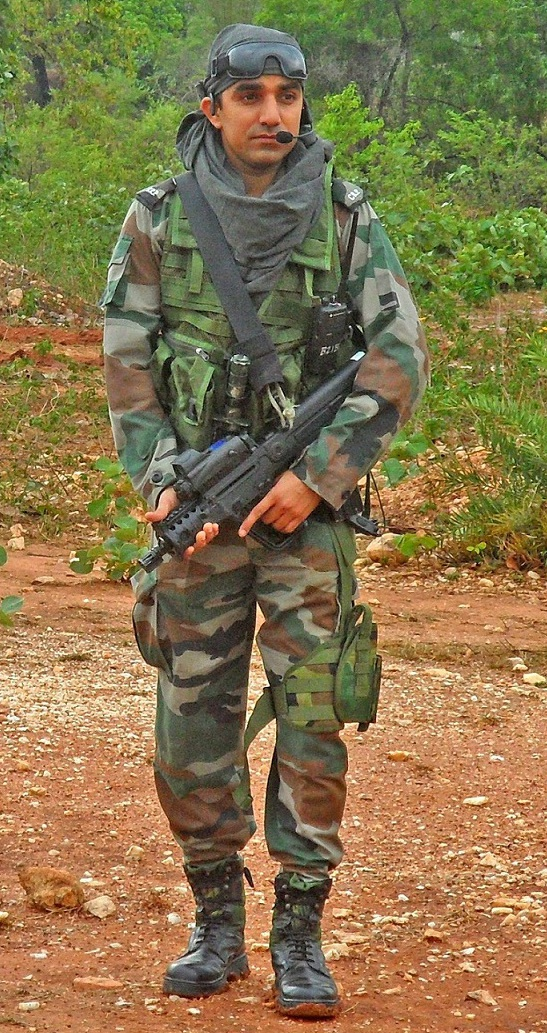
A CRPF commando with the IWI Tavor X95.

The following are the seven paramilitary police forces termed as Central Armed Police Forces (CAPFs). These forces were earlier referred to as the "central paramilitary forces". In 2011, the nomenclature CAPF was adopted to refer them.

=== Assam Rifles ===
The Assam Rifles trace their lineage to a paramilitary police force that was formed under British rule in 1835 called Cachar Levy. Since then, the Assam Rifles have undergone a number of name changes before the name Assam Rifles was finally adopted in 1917. Over the course of its history, the Assam Rifles and its predecessor units have served in several roles, conflicts, and theatres, including World War I, where they served in Europe and the Middle East, and World War II, where they served mainly in Burma. In the post-World War II period, the Assam Rifles have expanded greatly, as has their role. There are currently 46 battalions of Assam Rifles under the control of the Indian Ministry of Home Affairs (MHA). They perform many roles, including: the provision of internal security under the control of the army through the conduct of counterinsurgency and border security operations, the provision of aid to the civil power in times of emergency, and the provision of communications, medical assistance, and education in remote areas. In times of war, they can also be used as a combat force to secure rear areas if needed.

=== Central Reserve Police Force ===
Central Reserve Police Force (CRPF) is the largest of the CAPFs with 325,000 personnel in 246 battalions. The CRPF includes the Rapid Action Force (RAF), a 15 battalion anti-riot force trained to respond to sectarian violence, and the Commando Battalion for Resolute Action (COBRA), a 10 battalion strong anti-Naxalite force.

=== Border Security Force ===
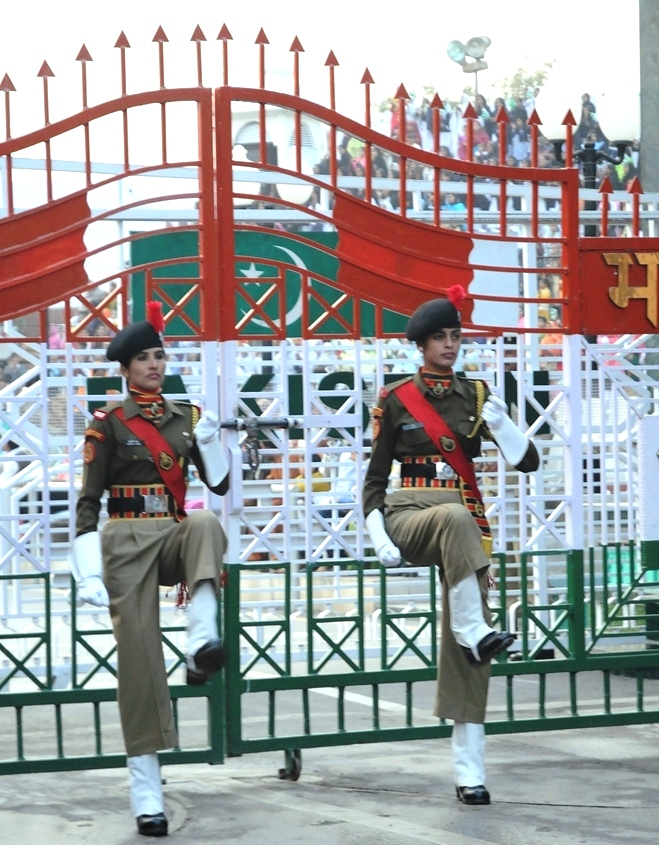
Women personnel of Border Security Force at Attari-Wagah border.

The primary role of the Border Security Force (BSF) is to guard the land borders of the country, except the mountains. The sanctioned strength is 265,277 personnel in 193 battalions, and is headed by an Indian Police Service officer.

=== Indo-Tibetan Border Police ===
The Indo-Tibetan Border Police (ITBP) is deployed for guard duties on the border with China from Karakoram Pass in Ladakh to Diphu La in Arunachal Pradesh, covering a total distance of 2,488 kilometres (1,546 mi). It has 90,000 personnel in 60 battalions.

=== Sashastra Seema Bal ===
The objective of the Sashastra Seema Bal (SSB) is to guard the Indo-Nepal and Indo-Bhutan Borders. As of 2019, it has 94,261 active personnel in 73 battalions, and a strength of 98,965 is sanctioned.

=== Central Industrial Security Force ===
One of the largest industrial security forces in the world, the Central Industrial Security Force (CISF) provides security to various public sector companies (PSUs) and other critical infrastructure installations across the country, such as airports. It has a total strength of about 144,418 personnel in 132 battalions.

=== National Security Guard ===
The National Security Guard (NSG) is an elite counter-terrorist and rapid response force. Its roles include conducting anti-sabotage checks, rescuing hostages, neutralising terrorist threats to vital installations, engaging terrorists, and responding to hijacking and piracy. It has 8636 personnel in total, including 1086 personnel for regional hubs. The NSG also includes the Special Ranger Group (SRG), whose 3,000 personnel used to protect India's VVIPs earlier; however, they were withdrawn from this role in October 2024.

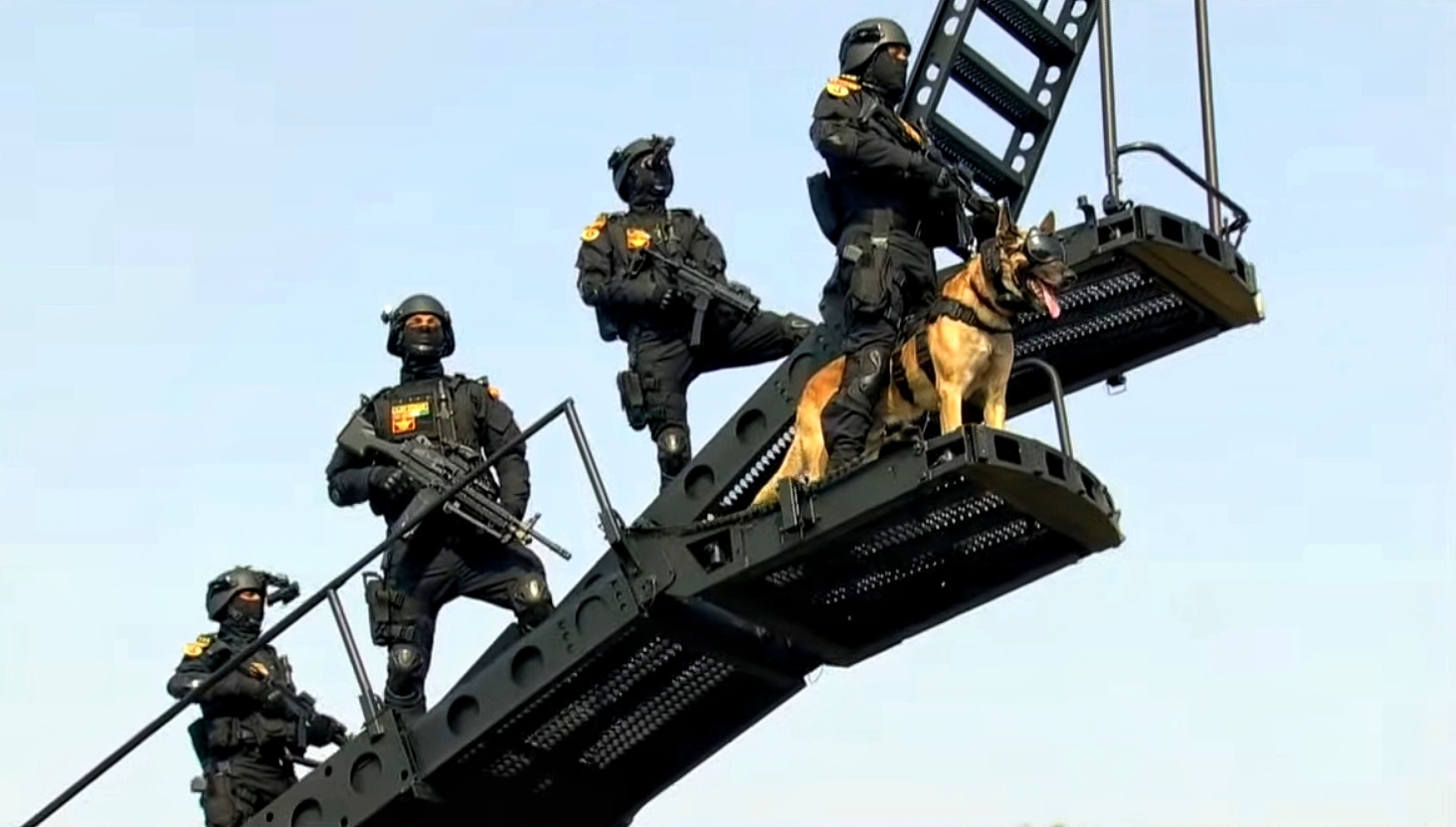
NSG operator with SIG MPX, M249 SAW and MP5 during Republic Day parade in 2021.

== Paramilitary forces ==
=== Special Frontier Force ===
The Special Frontier Force (SFF) is India's paramilitary unit. It was initially conceived in the post Sino-Indian war period as a guerrilla force composed mainly of Tibetan refugees whose main goal was to conduct covert operations behind Chinese lines in case of another war between the People's Republic of China and India. Later, its composition and roles were expanded.

Based in Chakrata, Uttarakhand, SFF is also known as the Establishment 22. The force is under the direct supervision of the Research and Analysis Wing, India's external intelligence agency.

=== Special Protection Group ===
The Special Protection Group (SPG) was formed in 1988 by an act of the Parliament of India to "provide proximate security to the Prime Minister of India and former Prime Minister of India and members of their immediate families (wife, husband, children, and parents)". For former Prime Ministers and their dependents, a regular review is held to decide whether the threat to their life is high enough to warrant SPG protection.

=== Railway Protection Force ===
The Railway Protection Force (RPF) was established under the Railway Protection Force Act 1957. The RPF is charged with providing security for Indian Railways. As of March 2020, it had a sanctioned strength of 74,830 personnel, with 61,869 of them on roll.

=== National Disaster Response Force ===
The National Disaster Response Force (NDRF) is a specialised constituted "for specialist response to a threatening disaster situation or disaster". It is manned by persons on deputation from the various Central Armed Police Forces. At present, it has 12 battalions, located in different parts of India. The control of NDRF lies with the National Disaster Management Authority (NDMA), which is headed by the Prime Minister.

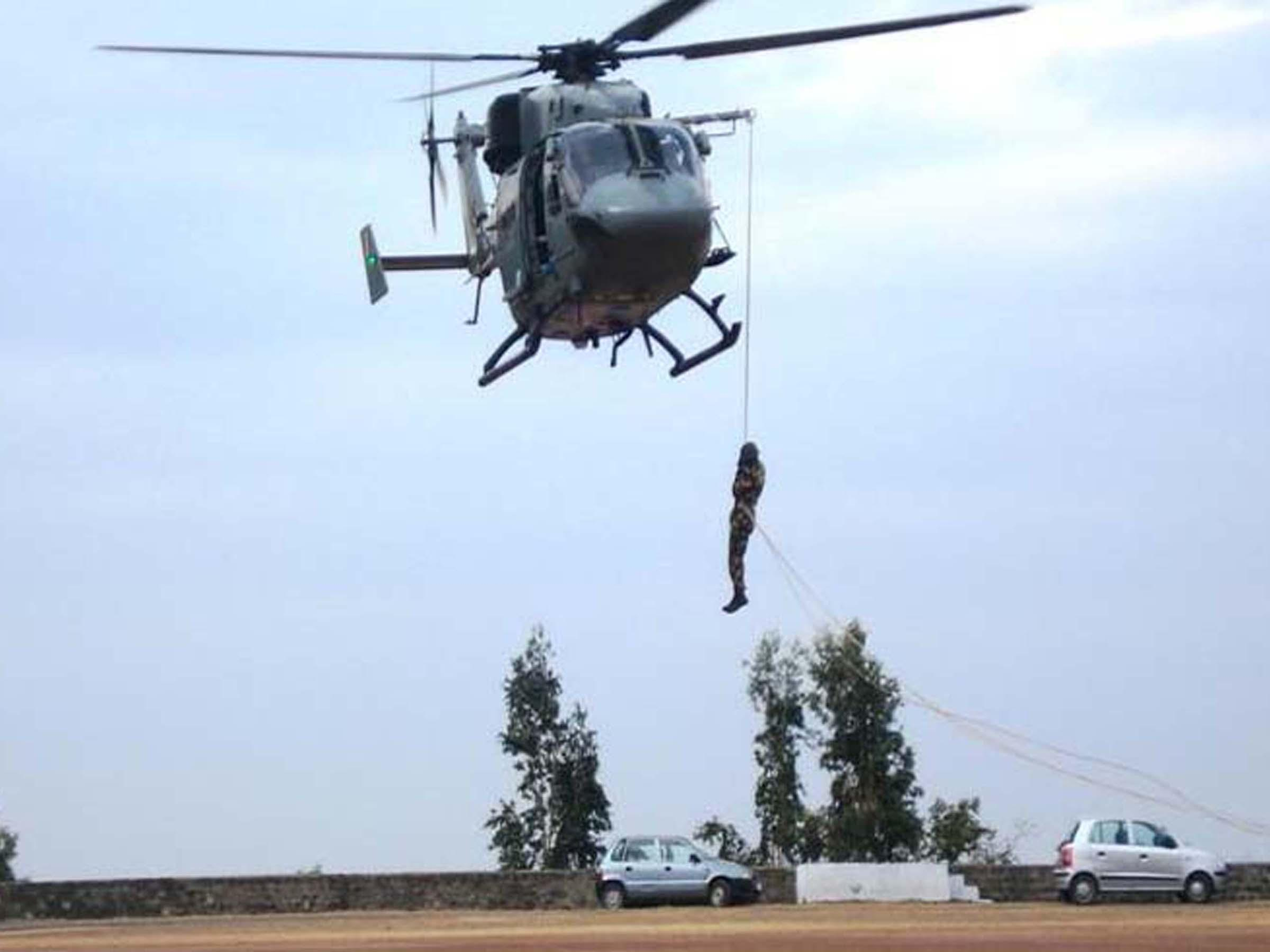
NDRF personnel undergoing training

== Special Forces ==
The Special Forces of India are Indian military units with specialised training in the field of special operations such as "Direct action, Hostage rescue, Counter-terrorism, Unconventional warfare, Special reconnaissance, Foreign Internal Defence, Personnel recovery, Asymmetric warfare and Counter-proliferation". The various branches include:

- Para (Special Forces): Formed in 1966, the Para (SF) are the largest and most important part of the Special Forces of India. They are a part of the highly trained Parachute Regiment of the Indian Army. The main aim of having a Parachute Regiment is for quick deployment of soldiers behind the enemy lines to attack the enemy from behind and destroy their first line of defence. Para (SF) conducts an annual series of joint exercises with US Army Special Forces called Vajra Prahar.

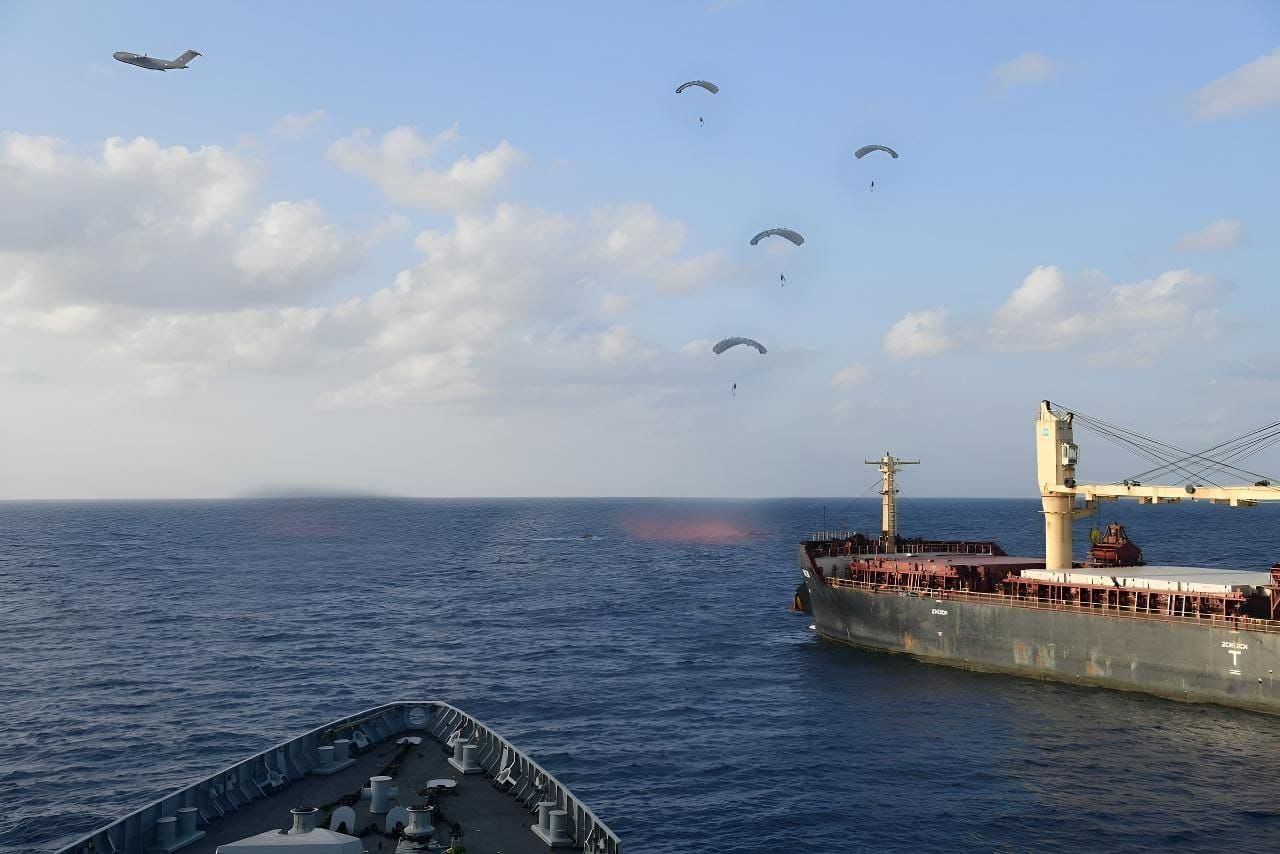
Marine Commandos being paradropped, rescuing 17 crew members of tanker MV Ruen from pirates as part of Operation Sankalp

- Marine Commandos (MARCOS): Marine Commandos (MARCOS) is an elite special operations unit of the Indian Navy. It is specially organised, trained, and equipped for the conduct of special operations in a maritime environment. The force has gradually acquired experience and a reputation for professionalism over the two decades it has been in existence. Now it is one of the finest Special Forces units in the world and among the few units qualified to jump in the water with a full combat load. The MARCOS are capable of undertaking operations in all types of terrain, but are specialised in maritime operations in Jammu and Kashmir through the Jhelum River and Wular Lake. To strengthen its capabilities to carry out special operations, the navy is planning to procure advanced Integrated Combat System (ICS) for the MARCOS. The Navy wants the ICS for effective command, control, and information sharing to maximise the capabilities of individuals and groups of the MARCOS while engaging enemies. The individual equipment required by the Navy in the ICS includes lightweight helmets, head-mounted displays, tactical and soft ballistic vests, along with communication equipment. The group-level gear requirements include command and control and surveillance systems, along with high-speed communication equipment.
- Garud Commando Force: The Garud Commando Force is the Special Forces unit of the Indian Air Force. It was formed in September 2004 and has a strength of approximately 2000 personnel. The unit derives its name from Garuda, a divine bird-like creature of Hindu Mythology. Garud is tasked with the protection of critical Air Force bases and installations; search and rescue during peace and hostilities, and disaster relief during calamities. Garuds are deployed in the Congo as part of the UN peacekeeping operations.

== Nuclear weapons ==
India has had nuclear weapons since 1974. Its most recent nuclear test took place on 11 May 1998, when Operation Shakti (Pokhran-II) was initiated with the detonation of one fusion and three fission bombs. On 13 May 1998, two additional fission devices were detonated. However, India maintains a "no-first use" and a nuclear deterrence policy against nuclear adversaries. Its nuclear doctrine envisages building a credible minimum deterrent for maintaining a "second strike capability" which would be massive and designed to induce unacceptable damage on the enemy. India is one of only four nations in the world to possess a Nuclear triad. India's nuclear missiles include the Prithvi, the Agni, the Shaurya, the Sagarika, the Dhanush, and others. India conducted its first test with the Agni-V in April 2012 and a second test in September 2013. With its 7,000 kilometres (4,300 mi) range, it can carry a nuclear warhead to the east to include all of China, and to the west deep into Europe. Agni-VI, with a perceived range of 10,000–12,000 kilometres (6,200–7,500 mi) is also under development with features like multiple independently targetable re-entry warheads (MIRVs).

India also had bomber aircraft such as the Tupolev Tu-142 and well as fighter jets like the Dassault Rafale, Sukhoi Su-30MKI, the Dassault Mirage 2000, the MiG-29 and the HAL Tejas capable of being armed with nuclear-tipped bombs and missiles. Since India does not have a nuclear first-use policy against an adversary, it becomes important to protect from a first strike. This protection is being developed in the form of the two layered Anti-ballistic missile defence system.

India's Strategic Nuclear Command controls its land-based nuclear warheads, while the navy controls the ship and submarine-based missiles, and the air force controls the air-based warheads. India's nuclear warheads are deployed in five areas:

1. Ship based mobile, like the Dhanush. (operational)
2. Land-based mobile, like the Agni. (operational)
3. Fixed underground silos (operational)
4. Submarine based, like the Sagarika. (operational)
5. Air-based warheads of the Indian Air Forces' strategic bomber force like the Dassault Mirage 2000 and the Jaguar (operational)

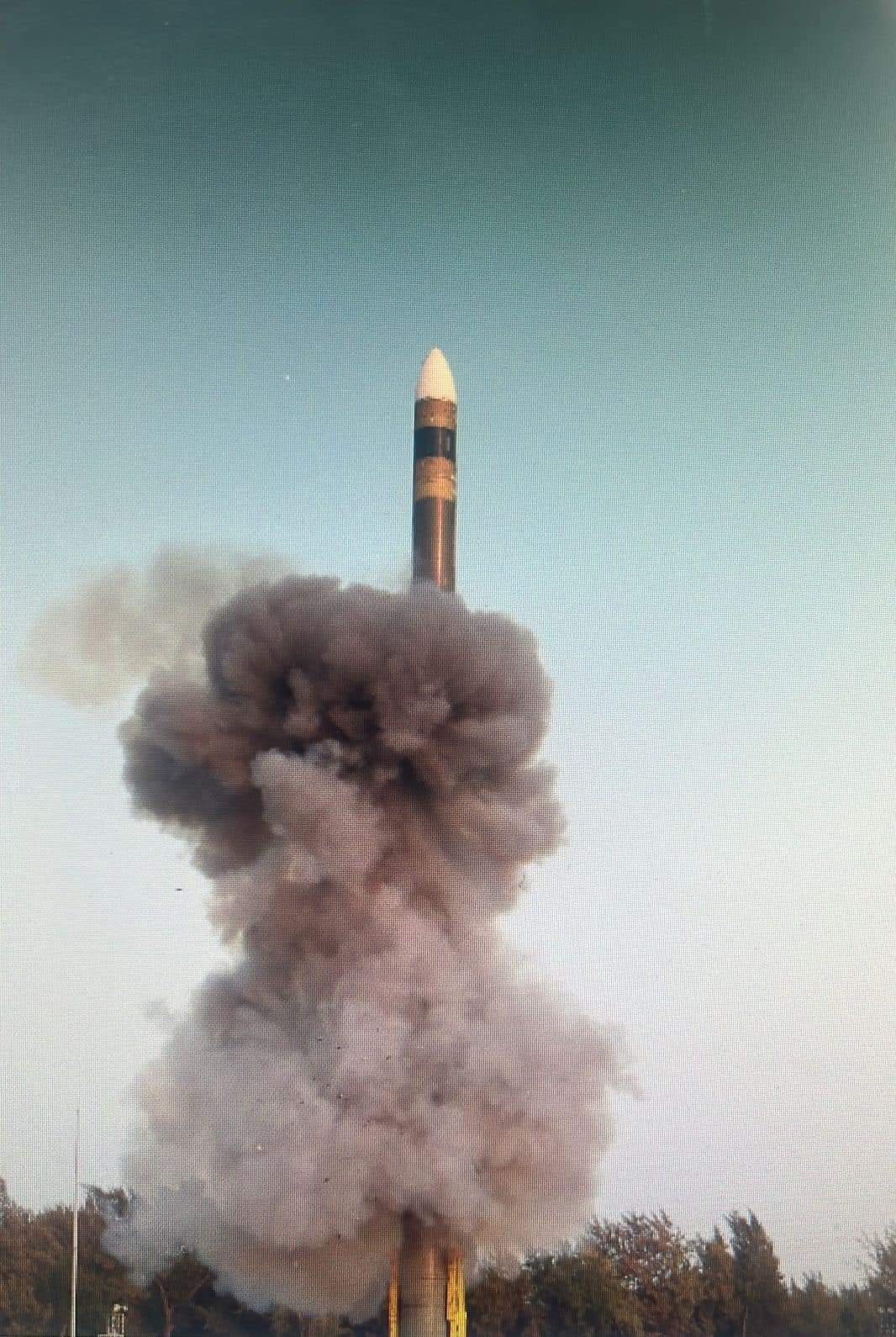
MIRV variant of Agni-V

Land-based nuclear armed ballistic missiles
Name	Type	Range (km)	Status
Prithvi-I	Short-range ballistic missile	150	Deployed
Prithvi-II	Short-range ballistic missile	250–350	Deployed
Prithvi-III	Short-range ballistic missile	350–600	Deployed
Agni-I	Short / Medium-range ballistic missile	700–1,250	Deployed
Agni-II	Medium-range ballistic missile	2,000–3,000	Deployed
Agni-III	Intermediate-range ballistic missile	3,500–5,000	Deployed
Agni-IV	Intermediate-range ballistic missile	4,000	Deployed
Agni-V	Intercontinental ballistic missile and MIRV	7,000-8,000	Deployed
Agni-VI	Intercontinental ballistic missile and MIRV	10,000–12,000	Under development
Surya	Intercontinental ballistic missile and MIRV	12,000–16,000	Unconfirmed

Sea-based nuclear armed ballistic missiles
Name	Type	Range (km/mi)	Status
Dhanush	Short-range ballistic missile	350 km (220 mi)	Operational
Sagarika (K-15)	Submarine-launched ballistic missile	700 km (430 mi)	Operational
K-4	Submarine-launched ballistic missile	4,000	Tested
K-5	Submarine-launched ballistic missile	5,000	Under Development
K-6	Submarine-launched ballistic missile	6,000	Under Development

=== Nuclear-armed cruise missiles ===
BrahMos:

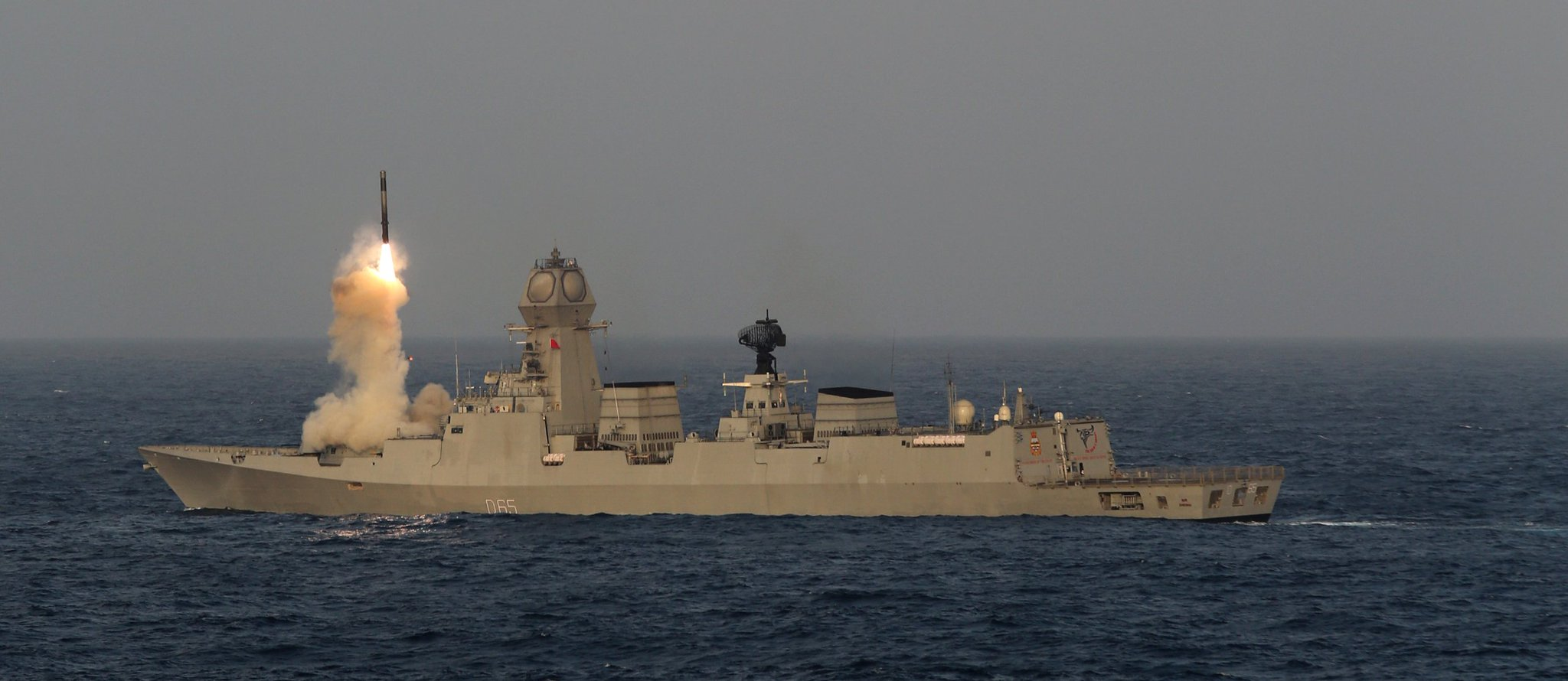
INS Chennai firing BrahMos (missile).

The BrahMos is a Mach 3 Supersonic Cruise Missile developed in collaboration with Russia. Its land attack and anti-ship variants are in service with the Indian Army and Indian Navy. Sub-Launched and air-launched variants are under development or testing.

- BrahMos II

The BrahMos II is a Mach 7 Hypersonic Cruise Missile being developed in collaboration with Russia.

Nirbhay:

The Nirbhay is a Long Range Sub-Sonic Cruise Missile. This Missile has a range of over 1,000 kilometres (620 mi).

=== Other missiles ===
Akash:

The Aakash is a medium-range, mobile surface-to-air missile defence system. The missile system can target aircraft up to 30 kilometres (19 mi) away, at altitudes up to 18,000 metres (20,000 yd)

Nag:

The Nag is a third-generation "Fire-and-forget" anti-tank missile developed in India. It is one of five missile systems developed by the Defence Research and Development Organisation (DRDO) under the Integrated Guided Missile Development Program (IGMDP).

HELINA:

The HELINA is a variant of the NAG Missile to be launched from a helicopter. It will be structurally different from the Nag.

Shaurya:

The Shaurya is a canister launched hypersonic surface-to-surface tactical missile with a range more than 750 kilometres (470 mi). It provides the potential to strike an adversary in the short-intermediate range.

Prahaar:

The Prahaar is a solid-fuelled surface-to-surface guided short-range tactical ballistic missile.

Astra:

The Astra is a "Beyond Visual Range Air-to-Air Missile" (BVRAAM) developed for the Indian Air Force.

=== India's nuclear doctrine ===
India has a declared nuclear no-first-use policy and is in the process of developing a nuclear doctrine based on "credible minimum deterrence". In August 1999, the Indian government released a draft of the doctrine which asserts that nuclear weapons are solely for deterrence and that India will pursue a policy of "retaliation only". The document also maintains that India "will not be the first to initiate a nuclear first strike, but will respond with punitive retaliation should deterrence fail".

The fourth National Security Advisor of India Shivshankar Menon signalled a significant shift from "no first use" to "no first use against non-nuclear weapon states" in a speech on the occasion of the Golden Jubilee celebrations of the National Defence College in New Delhi on 21 October 2010, a doctrine Menon said reflected India's "strategic culture, with its emphasis on minimal deterrence". However, whether the policy shift actually took place or not is unclear. Some argued that this was not a substantive change but "an innocent typographical or lexical error in the text of the speech". India's current PM Modi has, in the run up to the recent general elections, reiterated commitment to no first use policy. In April 2013 Shyam Saran, convener of the National Security Advisory Board, affirmed that regardless of the size of a nuclear "attack against India," be it a miniaturised version or a "big" missile, India will "retaliate massively to inflict unacceptable damage". Here, the term "attack against India" means attack against the "Union of India" or "Indian forces anywhere".

== Missile defence programme ==
India's missile defence network has two principal components – the Air Defence Ground Environment System (ADGES) and the Base Air Defence Zones (BADZ). The ADGES network provides for wide-area radar coverage and permits the detection and interception of most aerial incursions into Indian airspace. The BADZ system is far more concentrated with radars, interceptors, surface-to-air missiles (SAMs), and anti-aircraft artillery (AAA) units working together to provide an intense and highly effective defensive barrier to attacks on vital targets.

=== Ballistic missile defence ===
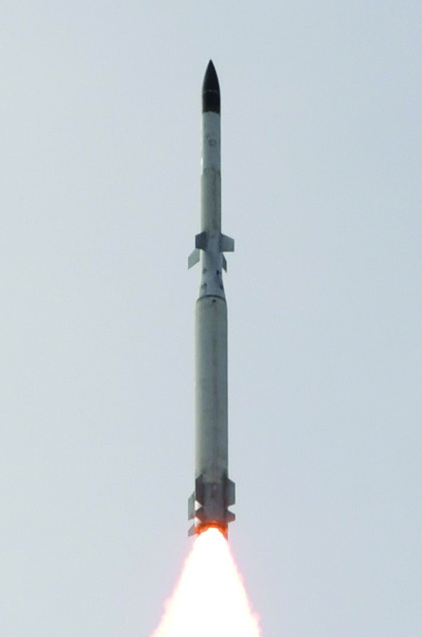
Second phase of Anti-ballistic Missile defence test with AD-1 missile

The Ballistic Missile Defence Program is an initiative to develop and deploy a multi-layered ballistic missile defence system to protect India from ballistic missile attacks.

Introduced in light of the ballistic missile threat from Pakistan, it is a double-tiered system consisting of two interceptor missiles, namely the Prithvi Air Defence (PAD) missile for high-altitude interception, and the Advanced Air Defence (AAD) Missile for lower altitude interception. The two-tiered shield should be able to intercept any incoming missiles launched 5,000 kilometres (3,100 mi) away.

PAD was tested in November 2006, followed by AAD in December 2007. With the test of the PAD missile, India became the fourth country to have successfully developed an anti-ballistic missile system, after the United States, Russia and Israel. On 6 March 2009, India again successfully tested its missile defence shield, during which an incoming "enemy" missile was intercepted at an altitude of 75 kilometres (47 mi).

On 6 May 2012, it was announced that Phase I is complete and can be deployed on short notice to protect Indian cities. New Delhi, the national capital, and Mumbai, have been selected for the ballistic missile defence shield. After successful implementation in Delhi and Mumbai, the system will be used to cover other major cities in the country. This shield can destroy incoming ballistic missiles launched from as far as 2,500 kilometres (1,600 mi) away. When Phase II is completed, and the PDV is developed, the two anti-ballistic missiles can intercept targets up to 5,000 kilometres (3,100 mi) both at exo and endo-atmospheric (inside the atmosphere) regions. The missiles will work in tandem to ensure a hit probability of 99.8 per cent. This system can handle multiple targets simultaneously with multiple interceptors. India is reported to have procured a squadron of S-300V systems, which are in use as an anti-tactical ballistic missile screen.

=== Cruise missile defence ===
Defending against an attack by a cruise missile, on the other hand, is similar to tackling low-flying manned aircraft, and hence most methods of aircraft defence can be used for a cruise missile defence system. To ward off the threats of nuclear-tipped cruise missile attack, India has a new missile defence programme which will be focused solely on intercepting cruise missiles. The technological breakthrough has been created with an AAD missile. DRDO Chief, Dr. V K Saraswat stated in an interview: "Our studies have indicated that this AAD will be able to handle a cruise missile intercept."

Furthermore, India is acquiring airborne radars like AWACS to ensure detection of cruise missiles to stay on top of the threat. Barak-8 is a long-range anti-air and anti-missile naval defence system being developed jointly by Israel Aerospace Industries (IAI) and the Defence Research and Development Organisation (DRDO) of India. The Indian Army is considering the induction of a variant of the Barak 8 missile to meet its requirement for a medium-range surface-to-air air defence missile. The naval version of this missile can intercept incoming enemy cruise missiles and combat jets targeting its warships at sea. It would also be inducted into the Indian Air Force, followed by the Army. Recently developed, India's Akash missile defence system also has the capability to "neutralise aerial targets like fighter jets, cruise missiles and air-to-surface missiles". Both the Barak-8 and the Akash missile defence systems can engage multiple targets simultaneously during saturation attacks.

On 17 November 2010, in an interview Rafael's vice-president Mr. Lova Drori confirmed that the David's Sling system has been offered to the Indian Armed Forces. This system is further designed to distinguish between decoys and the actual warhead of a missile.

=== S-400 Triumf ===
In October 2018, India inked an agreement with Russia for US$5.43 billion to purchase five S-400 Triumf surface-to-air missile defence systems.

== Defence intelligence ==
The Defence Intelligence Agency (DIA) is an organisation responsible for providing and coordinating intelligence for the Indian armed forces. It was created in March 2002 and is administered within the Union Ministry of Defence. It is headed by a Director General who is also the principal adviser to the Minister of Defence and the Chief of Defence Staff.

Traditionally, the bulk of intelligence work in India has been carried out by the Research and Analysis Wing (R&AW) and the Intelligence Bureau (IB). The various services intelligence directorates, namely the Directorate of Military Intelligence (DMI), the Directorate of Air Intelligence (DAI), the Directorate of Naval Intelligence (DNI), and some other agencies are also involved, but their activity is smaller by comparison. The R&AW and IB agencies are composed largely of civilians. Military personnel are often deputed to these agencies, but the letter of the law and concerns of deniability limit the use of serving military officers in some types of activity (especially collection and action). The creation of an intelligence agency coordinating the intelligence arms of the three military services had long been called for by senior Indian military officers. It was formally recommended by the Cabinet Group of Ministers, headed by the then Deputy Prime Minister of India Lal Krishna Advani. The Group of Ministers investigated intelligence lapses that occurred during the Kargil War and recommended a comprehensive reform of Indian intelligence agencies. The Defence Intelligence Agency was created and became operational in March 2002. As part of expanding bilateral co-operation on gathering intelligence and fighting terrorism, the United States military also provided advice to Indian military officers on the creation of the DIA.

DIA has control of MoD's prized technical intelligence assets – the Directorate of Signals Intelligence and the Defence Image Processing and Analysis Centre (DIPAC). While the Signals Directorate is responsible for acquiring and decrypting enemy communications, the DIPAC controls India's satellite-based image acquisition capabilities. The DIA also controls the Defence Information Warfare Agency (DIWA), which handles all elements of the information warfare repertoire, including psychological operations, cyber-war, electronic intercepts, and the monitoring of sound waves.

== Research and development ==
The Defence Research and Development Organisation (DRDO) is an agency of the Republic of India, responsible for the development of technology for use by the military, headquartered in New Delhi, India. It was formed in 1958 by the merger of the Technical Development Establishment and the Directorate of Technical Development and Production with the Defence Science Organisation. DRDO has a network of 52 laboratories which are engaged in developing defence technologies covering various fields, like aeronautics, armaments, electronic and computer sciences, human resource development, life sciences, materials, missiles, combat vehicles development, and naval research and development. The organisation includes more than 5,000 scientists and about 25,000 other scientific, technical, and supporting personnel. Annual operating budget of the DRDO is pegged at $1.6 billion (2011–12).

=== Electronic-warfare, Cyber-warfare, military hardware ===
The DRDO's avionics programme has been a success story with its mission computers, radar warning receivers, high accuracy direction finding pods, synthetic aperture radar, Active Phased Array Radar, airborne jammers, and flight instrumentation in use across a wide variety of Indian Air Force aircraft and satellites. DRDO labs have developed many electronic warfare systems for IAF and the Indian Army, and high-performance Sonar systems for the navy.

DRDO also developed other critical military hardware, such as the Arjun Main Battle Tank, and is engaged in the development of a future Infantry Combat Vehicle. The DRDO is also a member of the trials teams for the T-72 upgrade and its fire control systems. INSAS, India's de facto standard small arms family, including assault rifle, light machine guns, and carbine, is developed at the Armament Research and Development Establishment, a DRDO laboratory. ARDE also worked on the development of Pinaka Multi Barrel Rocket Launcher, which has a maximum range of 39 kilometres (24 mi) – 40 kilometres (25 mi) and can fire a salvo of 12 high-explosive rockets in 44 seconds, neutralising a target area of 3.9 square km. This project was one of the first major Indian defence projects involving the Private sector. India has created the Defence Cyber Agency, which has the responsibility of conducting Cyberwarfare.

=== Missile development programme ===
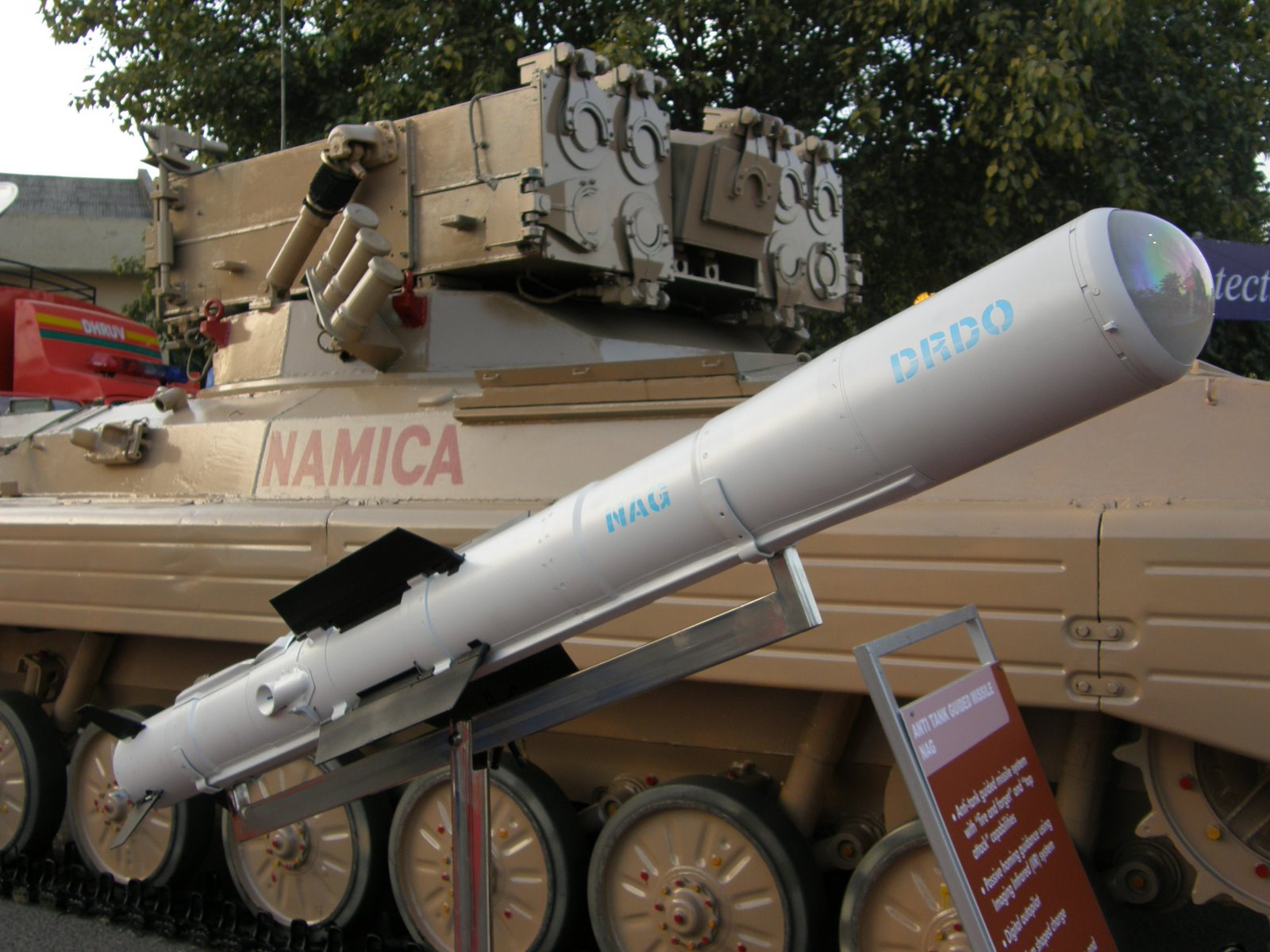
DRDO-built 3rd-generation ATGM Nag missile.

DRDO executed the Integrated Guided Missile Development Programme (IGMDP) to establish the ability to develop and design a missile locally, and manufacture a range of missile systems for the three defence services. The programme has seen significant success in its two most important constituents – the Agni missiles and the Prithvi missiles, while two other programmes, the Akash SAM and the anti-tank Nag Missile have seen significant orders. Another significant project of DRDO has been the Astra beyond-visual-range air-to-air missile (BVR), for equipping IAF's air-superiority fighters. The crown jewel of DRDO has been the BrahMos programme (as a joint venture with Russian NPO), which aims at creating a range of supersonic cruise missiles derived from the Yakhont system. The DRDO has been responsible for the navigational systems on the BrahMos, aspects of its propulsion, airframe, and seeker, fire control systems, mobile command posts, and the Transporter Erector Launcher.

The US Department of Defence (Pentagon) has written to India's Ministry of Defence (MoD), proposing the two countries collaborate in jointly developing a next-generation version of the Javelin anti-tank missile.

=== Unmanned Aerial Vehicles ===
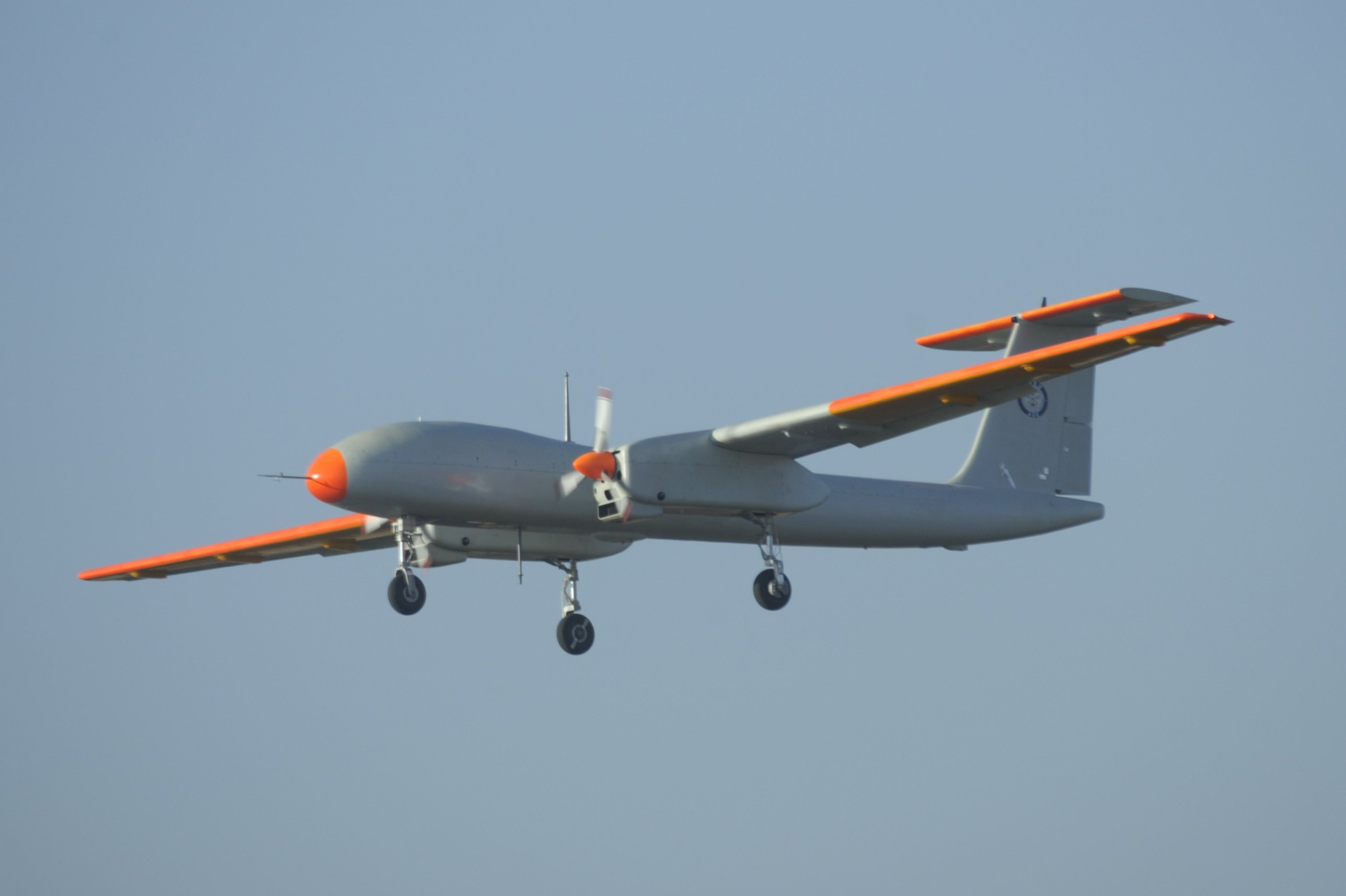
TAPAS-BH-201 MALE UAV.

The DRDO has also developed many unmanned aerial vehicles- such as the Nishant tactical UAV and the Lakshya Pilotless Target Aircraft (PTA). The Lakshya PTA has been ordered by all three services for their gunnery target training requirements. Efforts are ongoing to develop the PTA further, with an improved all-digital flight control system and a better turbojet engine. The DRDO is also going ahead with its plans to develop a new class of UAV, referred to by the HALE (High Altitude Long Endurance) and MALE (Medium Altitude Long Endurance) designations. The MALE UAV has been tentatively named the Rustom, and will feature canards and carry a range of payloads, including optronic, radar, laser designators, and ESM. The UAV will have conventional landing and take-off capability. The HALE UAV will have features such as SATCOM links, allowing it to be commanded beyond line of sight. Other tentative plans speak of converting the LCA into an unmanned combat aerial vehicle (UCAV), and weaponising UAVs such as AURA.

=== Anti-satellite weapon ===
In 2010, the defence ministry drafted a 15-year "Technology Perspective and Roadmap", which held development of ASAT weapons "for electronic or physical destruction of satellites in both LEO (2,000-km altitude above earth's surface) and the higher geosynchronous orbit" as a thrust area in its long-term integrated perspective plan under the management of DRDO. On 10 February 2010, Defence Research and Development Organisation Director-General, and Scientific Advisor to the Defence Minister, Dr VK Saraswat stated that India had "all the building blocks necessary" to integrate an anti-satellite weapon to neutralise hostile satellites in low earth and polar orbits. India is known to have been developing an exo-atmospheric kill vehicle that can be integrated with the missile to engage satellites.

On 27 March 2019, India conducted the first test of an ASAT weapon.

=== Future programmes ===
==== Directed-energy weapons ====
It is also known that DRDO is working on a slew of directed energy weapons (DEWs) and has identified DEWs, along with space security, cyber-security, and hypersonic vehicles/missiles as focus areas in the next 15 years.

==== Hypersonic Technology Demonstrator Vehicle ====
The Hypersonic Technology Demonstrator Vehicle (HSTDV) is an unmanned scramjet demonstration aircraft for hypersonic flight (Mach 6.5). The HSTDV program is run by the DRDO.

== Peacekeeping, anti-piracy, and exploration missions ==
=== United Nations peacekeeping ===
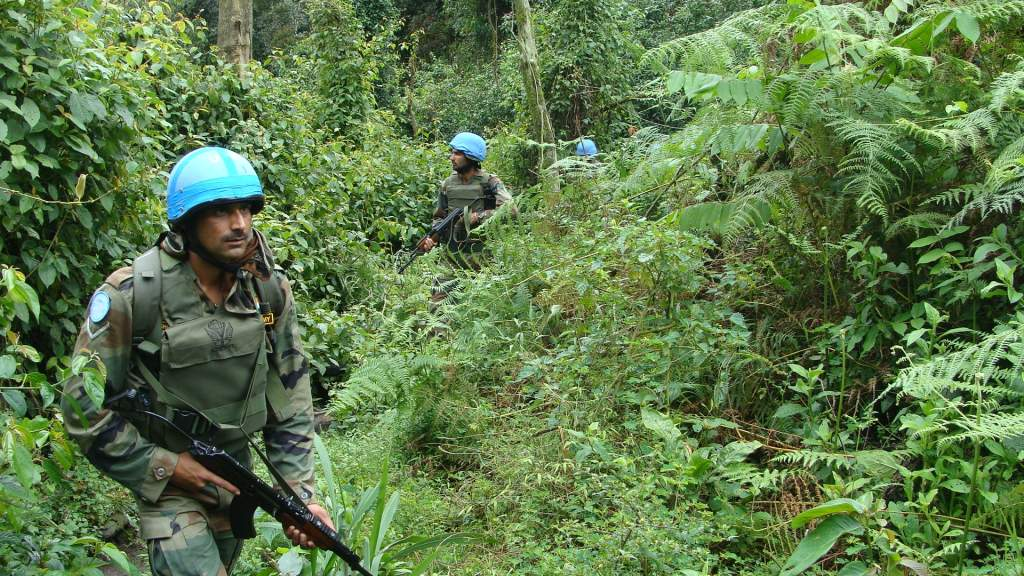
Indian soldiers patrol under UN mission in Congo, Africa, 2014.

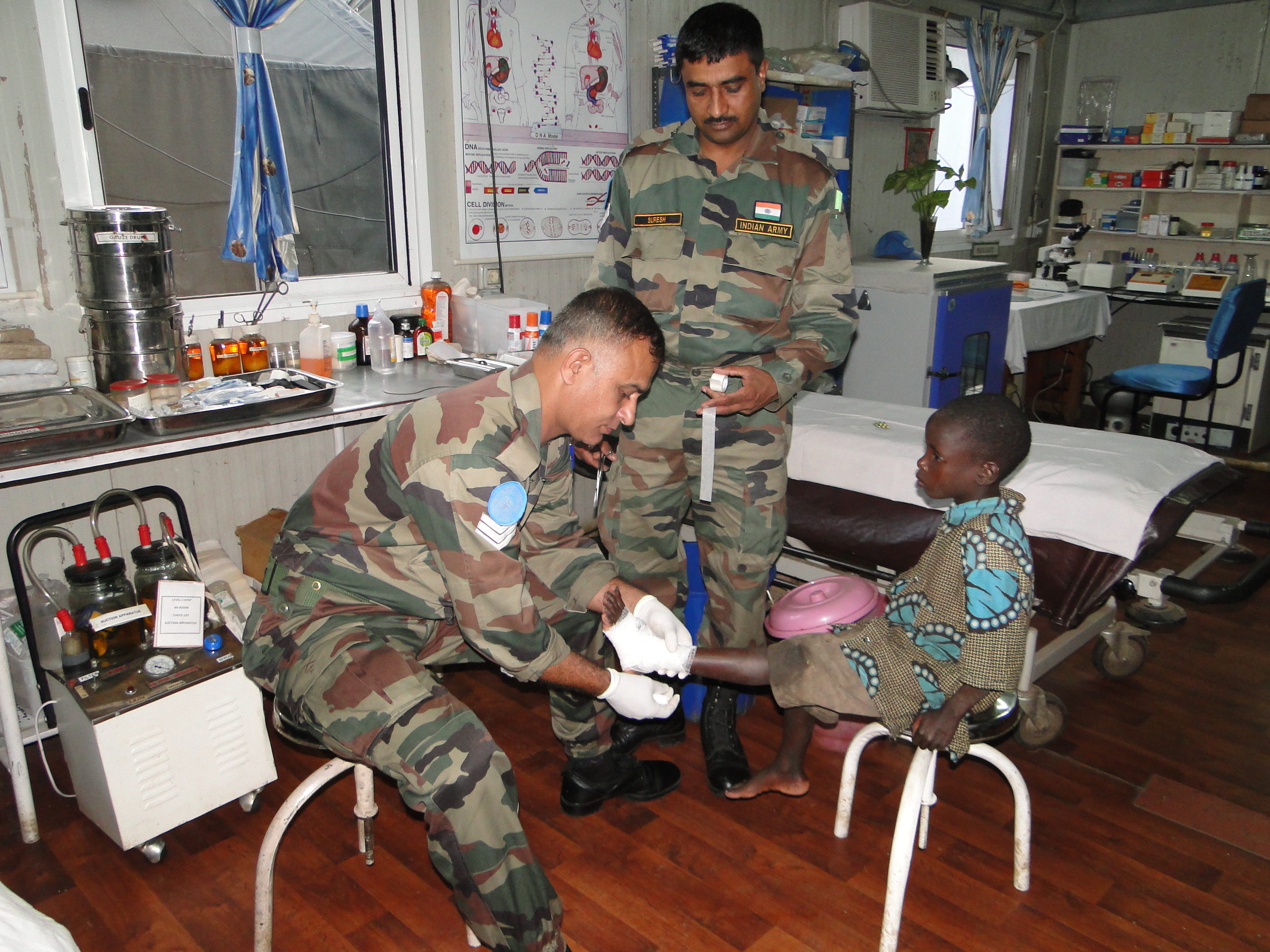
Indian Army doctors attend to a child in Congo.

India has been the largest troop contributor to UN missions since their inception. So far, India has taken part in 43 peacekeeping missions with a total contribution exceeding 160,000 troops and a significant number of police personnel having been deployed. India has so far, provided one Military Advisor (Lt Gen R K Mehta), one Police Adviser (Ms Kiran Bedi), one Deputy Military Adviser (Lt Gen Abhijit Guha), 14 Force Commanders and numerous Police Commissioners in various UN Missions. The Indian Army has also contributed lady officers as Military Observers and Staff Officers apart from them forming part of Medical Units being deployed in UN Missions. The first all-women contingent in a peacekeeping mission was a Formed Police Unit from India, deployed in 2007 to the UN Operation in Liberia(UNMIL). India has suffered 127 soldier deaths while serving on peacekeeping missions. India has also provided army contingents performing a peacekeeping operation in Sri Lanka between 1987 and 1990 as the Indian Peace Keeping Force.In November 1988, India also helped to restore the government of Maumoon Abdul Gayoom in the Maldives under Operation Cactus. As of June 2013, about 8000 Indian UN peacekeepers, both men and women, are deployed in nine missions, including the Congo, South Sudan, Liberia, UNDOF, Haiti, Lebanon, Abeyi, Cyprus and Cote de Ivoire.

=== Anti-piracy mission ===
India sought to augment its naval force in the Gulf of Aden by deploying the larger INS Mysore to patrol the area. Somalia also added India to its list of states, including the US and France, who are permitted to enter its territorial waters, extending up to 12 nautical miles (22 km; 14 mi) from the coastline, in an effort to check piracy. An Indian naval official confirmed receipt of a letter acceding to India's prerogative to check such piracy. "We had put up a request before the Somali government to play a greater role in suppressing piracy in the Gulf of Aden in view of the United Nations resolution. The TFG government gave its nod recently." In November 2008, an Indian navy warship destroyed a suspected Somali pirate vessel after it came under attack in the Gulf of Aden. In a report on Somalia submitted to the Security Council, UN Secretary-General Ban Ki-moon said, "I welcome the decision of the governments of India and the Russian Federation to cooperate with the Transitional Federal Government of Somalia to fight piracy and armed robbery against ships." India also expressed the desire to deploy up to four more warships in the region. On 2010-09-06, a team of Indian marine commandos (MARCOS) boarded MV Jag Arnav and overpowered attacking pirates – seven heavily armed Somalis and one Yemeni national. In the seven-year time frame, India deployed 52 warships to combat piracy, which resulted in the area up to 65 degrees east being cleared of pirates.

=== Relief operations ===
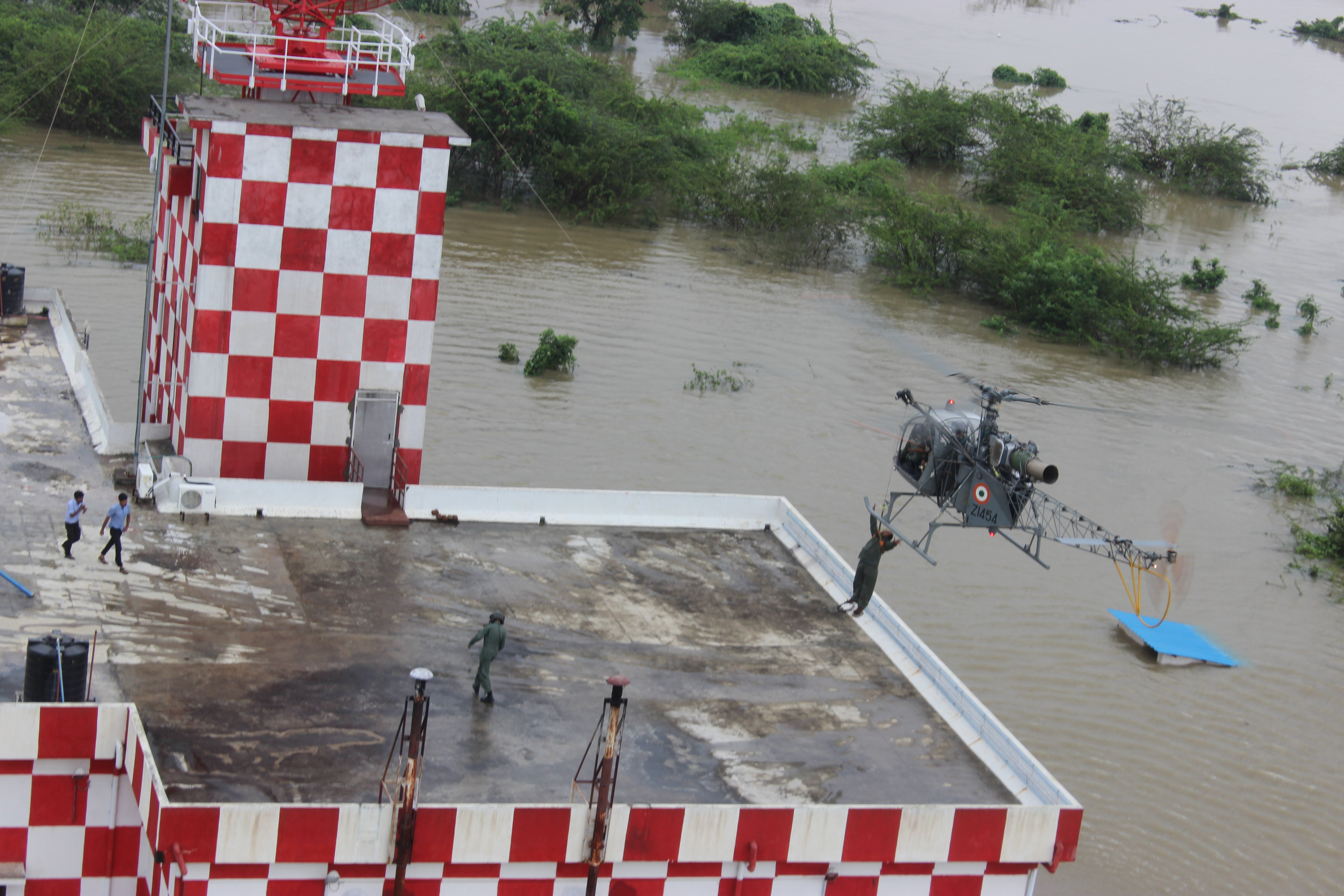
An Indian Air Force helicopter rescues stranded people during 2015 Chennai Floods.

The Indian Air Force provides regular relief operations for food and medical facilities around the world using its cargo aircraft, most notably the Ilyushin Il-76. The most recent relief operation of the IAF was in Kyrgyzstan. During the 2010 Ladakh floods, two Ilyushin Il-76 and four Antonov-32 aircraft of the IAF carried 30 tonnes of load, which included 125 rescue and relief personnel, medicines, generators, tents, portable X-ray machines, and emergency rescue kits. A MI-17 helicopter and a Cheetah helicopter were used to increase the effectiveness of the rescue operations. During the 2013 Uttrakhand Floods, the Indian armed forces took part in rescue operations. By 21 June 2013, the Army had deployed 10,000 soldiers and 11 helicopters, the Navy had sent 45 naval divers, and the Air Force had deployed 43 aircraft, including 36 helicopters. From 17 to 30 June 2013, the IAF airlifted a total of 18,424 people flying a total of 2,137 sorties and dropping/landing a total of 3,36,930 kg of relief material and equipment. The IAF participated in the rescue operation codenamed Operation Raahat and evacuated more than 4640 Indian citizens (along with 960 foreign nationals from 41 countries) from Yemen during the 2015 military intervention by Saudi Arabia and its allies in that country during the Yemeni Crisis.

=== IAF efforts in eclipse study ===
The Indian Air Force successfully undertook sorties to help Indian scientists study the total solar eclipse that took place on 23 July 2010. Two separate missions from Agra and Gwalior were flown along the path of the Moon's shadow, a mission that was deemed hugely successful by scientists associated with the experiment. While one AN-32 transport aircraft carrying scientific equipment, cameras, and scientists took off from Agra and landed back after a three-hour flight, a Mirage-2000 trainer from Gwalior took images of the celestial spectacle from 40,000 feet (12,000 m). With the weather being clear at such altitudes and coordinates planned by the IAF pilots, both the AN-32 and Mirage-2000 pilots were able to accomplish the mission.

=== Indian Navy exploration ===
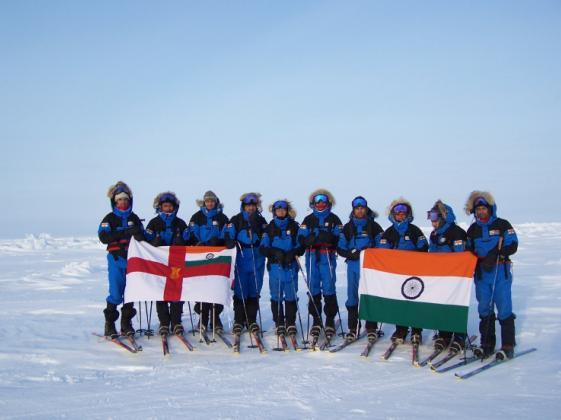
The Indian Navy expedition to North Pole, 2008.

The Indian Navy regularly conducts adventure expeditions. The sailing ship and training vessel INS Tarangini began circumnavigating the world on 23 January 2003, intending to foster good relations with other nations; she returned to India in May of the following year after visiting 36 ports in 18 nations. Lt. Cdr. M.S. Kohli led the Indian Navy's first successful expedition to Mount Everest in 1965. Another Navy team also successfully scaled Everest from the north face, the more technically challenging route. An Indian Navy team comprising 11 members completed an expedition to the North Pole in 2006. The Indian Naval ensign first flew in Antarctica in 1981. The Indian Navy succeeded in Mission Dakshin Dhruv by traversing to the South Pole on skis in 2006. With this historic expedition, they set the record for being the world's first military team to have completed a ski traverse to the geographic south pole.

== Misconceptions in nomenclature ==
There are a number of uniformed forces in India apart from the Indian Armed Forces. All such forces are established under the Acts of Parliament. They are: the Central Reserve Police Force, the Border Security Force, the Indo-Tibetan Border Police, the Central Industrial Security Force, the Sashastra Seema Bal, the Assam Rifles, the National Security Guard under the Ministry of Home Affairs (India), the Special Protection Group under the Cabinet Secretariat of India, the Railway Protection Force under Ministry of Railways (India), and the Indian Coast Guard (ICG) under the Ministry of Defence (India). These forces are referred to as "Armed Force of the Union" in their respective acts, which means a force with armed capability and not necessarily "Armed Forces", the term as per international standards and conventionally referred to as "Army", "Navy", and "Air Force". The Supreme Court in its judgements reported in AIR 1996 SC 1705 held that the military service is only confined to three principal wings of the armed forces, i.e., Army, Navy, and Air Force. Further the Supreme Court of India in a case reported in AIR 2000 SC 3948 clarified that unless it is a service in the three principal wing of the Armed Forces, a force included in the expression "Armed forces of the Union" does not constitute part of the military service/military. To differentiate from Armed Forces, Some of other forces were commonly referred to as Central Paramilitary Forces which caused confusion and give the impression of them being part of the military forces.

To remove such confusion, in 2011 the Ministry of Home Affairs adopted the uniform nomenclature of Central Armed Police Forces for only five of its Primary Police organisations. These were formerly called as Paramilitary Forces. Central Armed Police Forces are still incorrectly referred to as "Paramilitary Forces" in the media and in some correspondence. These forces are headed by officers from the Indian Police Service and are under the Ministry of Home Affairs. Other uniform services are referred to by their names only, such as the Railway Protection Force, the NSG, the SPG, the ICG, the Assam Rifles, etc., but not under any collective nomenclature. However, conventionally, some forces are referred to as the Paramilitary Forces of India, for example, the Assam Rifles, the SFF, and the ICG.

The Indian Coast Guard is often incorrectly confused with being a part of the military forces due to the organisation being under the Ministry of Defence. The Supreme Court, in its judgment, has held that unless it is a service in the three principal wings of the Armed Forces, a force included in the expression "Armed forces of the Union" does not constitute part of military service/military. The Indian Coast Guard works closely with civilian agencies such as Customs, the Department of Fisheries, the Coastal Police, etc., with its primary role being that of a non-military, maritime law enforcement agency. It is independent of the command and control of the Indian Navy. ICG was initially planned to be kept under the Ministry of Home Affairs, but has been kept under the Ministry of Defence for better synergy since it is patterned like the navy. The ICG does not take part in any protocol of military forces such as the President's Body Guard, ADCs, the Tri-Services Guard of Honour, etc. Their recruitment is also not under the Combined Defence Services Exam/National Defence Academy Exam, which is one of the prime modes of commissioning officers to the Armed Forces. Indian Coast Guard Officers continue to get their training with Indian Navy Officers since the ICG does not have its own training academy. Already, a new Indian Coast Guard Academy for training of their officers is under construction. Often, ICG loses its credit for being incorrectly recognised as part of the Indian military Forces and not as a unique independent force.

== See also ==
- Military budget of India
- National Security Council (India)
- Directorate of Ordnance (Coordination & Services)
- Defence Research and Development Organisation
- Defence Space Agency
- Institute for Defence Studies and Analyses
- Indian Armed forces rank flags
- Indian Army United Nations peacekeeping missions
- Indian National Army
- Subhas Chandra Bose

== Bibliography ==
- International Institute for Strategic Studies (25 February 2021). The Military Balance 2021. London: Routledge. ISBN 978-1-032-01227-8.
- International Institute for Strategic Studies (14 February 2020). The Military Balance 2020. London: Routledge. ISBN 978-0-367-46639-8.
- International Institute for Strategic Studies (15 February 2019). The Military Balance 2019. London: Routledge. ISBN 978-1-85743-988-5.
- International Institute for Strategic Studies (14 February 2018). The Military Balance 2018. London: Routledge. ISBN 978-1-85743-955-7.
- International Institute for Strategic Studies (24 December 2021). The Military Balance 2014. Routledge. ISBN 978-1-000-67421-7.
- International Institute for Strategic Studies (2012). The Military Balance 2012. Routledge. ISBN 978-1-85743-642-6.
- International Institute for Strategic Studies (2010). The Military Balance 2010. Taylor & Francis Group. ISBN 978-1-85743-557-3.
- Subramaniam, Arjun (2017). India's Wars: A Military History, 1947–1971. HarperCollins. ISBN 978-1-68247-241-5.
- Sharma, Lt. Col. Gautam (2000). Our Armed Forces. National Book Trust. ISBN 81-237-2785-2.
- Kundu, A (1998). Militarism in India. University of Michigan. Bloomsbury Publishing. ISBN 9-781-860-64318-7.
