= Directorate of Ordnance (Coordination & Services) =

Defence Production complex in India

- Logo of OFB used until 2021
- Formerly: Ordnance Factory Board (1979—2021)
- Industry: Defence production
- Founded: 1775; 251 years ago (as Board of Ordnance, Fort William); 2 April 1979; 47 years ago (as Ordnance Factory Board)
- Defunct: 1 October 2021; 5 years ago
- Fate: Corporatised
- Successors: Directorate of Ordnance (Coordination & Services): Advanced Weapons and Equipment India Limited; Armoured Vehicles Nigam Limited; Gliders India Limited; India Optel Limited; Munitions India Limited; Troop Comforts Limited; Yantra India Limited
- Headquarters: Ayudh Bhawan, Kolkata, West Bengal, India
- Area served: Worldwide
- Key people: Akhilesh Kumar Maurya, IOFS NDC (Director General)
- Products: Small arms, aircraft weapons, anti-aircraft warfare, naval weapons, anti-ship warfare, anti-submarine warfare, anti-tank warfare, missiles, missile launchers, rockets, rocket launchers, bombs, grenades, mortars, mines, metals, alloys, machine tools, military vehicles, engines, armoured vehicles, parachutes, optoelectronics, chemicals, clothing, artillery, ammunition, propellants, explosives
- Revenue: US$3 billion (₹22,389.22 crores) (2020–21)
- Number of employees: ~80,000
- Website: ddpdoo.gov.in

The Directorate of Ordnance (Coordination & Services) (abbreviated as DOO (C&S)) is a government authority under the Department of Defence Production (DDP) of Ministry of Defence (MoD), Government of India. Its primary work is to manage, instruct and coordinate the production of ordnance by public companies. It is the main regulatory body for Indian ordnance and is administered by the civil service, Indian Ordnance Factories Service (IOFS). The DOO(C&S) was earlier known as Ordnance Factory Board (OFB), consisting of the Indian Ordnance Factories. In 2021, the government corporatised the functions of the 41 Indian Ordnance Factories into 7 Defence Public Sector Undertakings (DPSUs). The government is merging them again in 2024, as the output of one factory serves as the input of the other.

OFB was the 37th largest defence equipment manufacturer in the world, 2nd largest in Asia, and the largest in India. OFB was the world's largest government operated production organisation and the oldest one in India. It had a total workforce of about 80,000 personnel. It was often called the "Fourth Arm of Defence" and the "Force Behind the Armed Forces" of India. Its total sales were at US$3 billion (₹22,389.22 crores) in the year 2020–21.

It was engaged in the research, development, production, testing, marketing and logistics of a range of products in the areas of air, land and sea defence systems. OFB consisted of 41 ordnance factories, 9 training institutes, 3 regional marketing centres and 4 regional controllerates of safety, which were spread all across the country. Every year, 18 March is celebrated as the Ordnance Factory Day in India.

== History ==
=== Origins ===
The Indian Ordnance Factories predate all the other organisations like the Indian Army and the Indian Railways by over a century. The first Indian ordnance factory can trace its origins back to the year 1712 when the Dutch Ostend Company established a Gun Powder Factory in Ichhapur. In 1787, another gunpowder factory was established at Ichapore; it began production in 1791 and the site was later used as a Rifle Factory beginning in 1904. In 1801, Gun Carriage Agency (now known as Gun and Shell Factory, Cossipore) was established at Cossipore, Calcutta and production began on 18 March 1802. This is the oldest ordnance factory in India still in existence.

=== Contributions ===
The Indian Ordnance Factories have not only supported India through the wars, but also played an important role in building India, with the advancement of technology and have ushered the Industrial Revolution in India, starting with the first modern steel, aluminium, copper plants of India, first modern electric textile mill of India, first chemical industries of India, establishing the first engineering colleges of India as its training schools, sparking India's first war of independence in 1857 with its rifles and bullets, and also played key role in the founding of research and industrial organisations like ISRO, DRDO, BDL, BEL, BEML, BHEL, SAIL, etc.

=== Timeline ===
- 1712 – Establishment of the Dutch Ostend Company's Gun Powder Factory at Ichhapur.
- 1775 – Establishment of the Board of Ordnance at Fort William, Kolkata.
- 1787 – Establishment of the Gun Powder Factory at Ishapore.
- 1791 – Production of gunpowder begins at Ishapore.
- 1801 – Establishment of Gun Carriage Agency at Cossipore, Kolkata.
- 1802 – Production begins at Cossipore on 18 March.
- 1906 – Administration of Indian Ordnance Factories came under a separate charge as Inspector General of Ordnance Factories.
- 1933 – Charged to Director of Ordnance Factories.
- 1935 – Indian Ordnance Service was introduced to administer the whole defence production industry of India.
- 1948 – Placed under direct control of Ministry of Defence.
- 1954 – Indian Ordnance Service (IOS) renamed to Indian Ordnance Factories Service (IOFS).
- 1962 – Department of Defence Production was set up at Ministry of Defence.
- 1979 – Ordnance Factory Board is established on 2 April.
- 2021 – Corporatisation of Indian Ordnance Factories and dissolution of Ordnance Factory Board on 1 October.

=== Restructuring OFB into seven DPSUs ===
On 17 June 2021, the Defence Ministry announced its plans to split the existing five operating divisions of OFB, in addition to parachutes and opto-electronics, into seven PSUs, wholly owned by the government. It was mentioned that all existing factories and employees will become a part of these seven PSUs. From 1 October 2021, OFB has been dissolved and all the management, control, operations and maintenance has been transferred to seven newly formed Defence PSUs, namely:

- Advanced Weapons and Equipment India Limited (AWE)
- Armoured Vehicles Nigam Limited (AVANI)
- Gliders India Limited (GIL)
- India Optel Limited (IOL)
- Munitions India Limited (MIL)
- Troop Comforts Limited (TCL)
- Yantra India Limited (YIL)

The new companies were launched and dedicated to the nation on 15 October 2021.

The Government is exploring the possibility of merging five of the seven defence public undertakings as of 2023, as the output of one factory serves as the input of the other.

== Infrastructure and Management ==
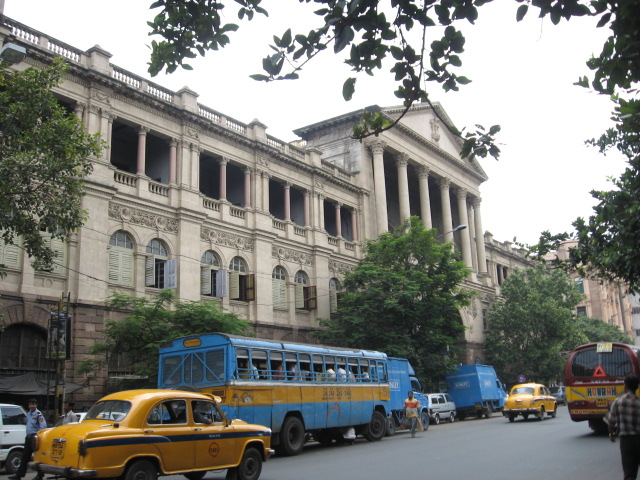
DOO(C&S)'s office at Esplanade, Kolkata

=== Headquarters ===
- Ayudh Bhawan, Kolkata (main headquarter of DOO(C&S))
- Armoured Vehicles Headquarters, Chennai
- Ordnance Equipment Factories Headquarters, Kanpur
- DOO(C&S) Office, New Delhi
- Ordnance Factory Cell, Mumbai
- Ordnance Factories Recruitment Centre, Nagpur

=== Apex Board ===
The Apex Board was headed by the Director General of Ordnance Factories (DGOF), who acted as the chairman of the board (ex officio Secretary to Government of India) and consisted of nine other members, who each held the rank of Additional DGOF. Ordnance factories were divided into five operating divisions, depending upon the type of the main products/technologies employed.

These were:

- Ammunition and Explosives
- Weapons, Vehicles and Equipments
- Materials and Components
- Armoured Vehicles
- Ordnance Equipment Group of Factories

Each of the above group of factories was headed by a Member/Additional DGOF who was in the rank of Special Secretary to Government of India. The four remaining members were responsible for staff functions, viz personnel, finance, planning and material management, and technical services, and they operated from Kolkata.

=== List of Ordnance factories ===
Each ordnance factory was headed by a General Manager who is in the rank of Additional Secretary to the Government of India.

Factory	Location	State	Defence PSU
Ammunition Factory, Khadki (AFK)	Pune	Maharashtra	Munitions India Limited
Cordite Factory, Aruvankadu (CFA)	Aruvankadu	Tamil Nadu	Munitions India Limited
Engine Factory, Avadi (EFA)	Chennai	Tamil Nadu	Armoured Vehicles Nigam Limited
Field Gun Factory, Kanpur (FGK)	Kanpur	Uttar Pradesh	Advanced Weapons and Equipment India Limited
Gun Carriage Factory, Jabalpur (GCF)	Jabalpur	Madhya Pradesh	Advanced Weapons and Equipment India Limited
Grey Iron Foundry (GIF)	Jabalpur	Madhya Pradesh	Yantra India Limited
Gun and Shell Factory, Cossipore (GSF)	Kolkata	West Bengal	Advanced Weapons and Equipment India Limited
Heavy Alloy Penetrator Project (HAPP)	Tiruchirappalli	Tamil Nadu	Munitions India Limited
High Explosives Factory (HEF)	Pune	Maharashtra	Munitions India Limited
Heavy Vehicles Factory, Chennai (HVF)	Chennai	Tamil Nadu	Armoured Vehicles Nigam Limited
Machine Tool Prototype Factory Ambernath (MPF)	Mumbai	Maharashtra	Armoured Vehicles Nigam Limited
Metal and Steel Factory (MSF)	Ishapore	West Bengal	Yantra India Limited
Ordnance Clothing Factory Avadi (OCFAV)	Chennai	Tamil Nadu	Troop Comforts Limited
Ordnance Factory Chandigarh (OCFC)	Chandigarh	Chandigarh	India Optel Limited
Ordnance Clothing Factory (OCFS)	Shahjahanpur	Uttar Pradesh	Troop Comforts Limited
Ordnance Equipment Factory Kanpur (OEFC)	Kanpur	Uttar Pradesh	Troop Comforts Limited
Ordnance Equipment Factory Hazratpur (OEFHZ)	Hazratpur	Uttar Pradesh	Troop Comforts Limited
Ordnance Factory Ambernath (OFA)	Mumbai	Maharashtra	Yantra India Limited
Ordnance Factory Ambajhari (OFAJ)	Nagpur	Maharashtra	Yantra India Limited
Ordnance Factory Bhandara (OFBA)	Bhandara	Maharashtra	Munitions India Limited
Ordnance Factory Bhusawal (OFBH)	Bhusawal	Maharashtra	Yantra India Limited
Ordnance Factory Bolangir (OFBOL)	Bolangir	Odisha	Munitions India Limited
Ordnance Factory Kanpur (OFC)	Kanpur	Uttar Pradesh	Advanced Weapons and Equipment India Limited
Ordnance Factory Chandrapur (OFCH)	Chandrapur	Maharashtra	Munitions India Limited
Ordnance Factory Dumdum (OFDC)	Kolkata	West Bengal	Yantra India Limited
Ordnance Factory Dehu Road (OFDR)	Pune	Maharashtra	Munitions India Limited
Ordnance Factory Dehradun (OFDUN)	Dehradun	Uttarakhand	India Optel Limited
Ordnance Factory Itarsi (OFI)	Itarsi	Madhya Pradesh	Munitions India Limited
Ordnance Factory Khamaria (OFK)	Jabalpur	Madhya Pradesh	Munitions India Limited
Ordnance Factory Katni (OFKAT)	Katni	Madhya Pradesh	Yantra India Limited
Ordnance Factory Muradnagar (OFM)	Ghaziabad	Uttar Pradesh	Yantra India Limited
Ordnance Factory Project (OFN)	Nalanda	Bihar	Munitions India Limited
Ordnance Factory Project Korwa (OFPKR)	Korwa	Uttar Pradesh	Advanced Weapons and Equipment India Limited
Ordnance Factory Project Medak (OFPM)	Hyderabad	Telangana	Armoured Vehicles Nigam Limited
Ordnance Factory Tiruchirappalli (OFT)	Tiruchirappalli	Tamil Nadu	Advanced Weapons and Equipment India Limited
Ordnance Factory Varangaon (OFV)	Varangaon	Maharashtra	Munitions India Limited
Opto Electronics Factory (OLF)	Dehradun	Uttarakhand	India Optel Limited
Ordnance Parachute Factory (OPF)	Kanpur	Uttar Pradesh	Gliders India Limited
Rifle Factory Ishapore (RFI)	Ishapore	West Bengal	Advanced Weapons and Equipment India Limited
Small Arms Factory (SAF)	Kanpur	Uttar Pradesh	Advanced Weapons and Equipment India Limited
Vehicle Factory Jabalpur (VFJ)	Jabalpur	Madhya Pradesh	Armoured Vehicles Nigam Limited

=== Training institutes, regional centres and controllerates ===
National Academy of Defence Production provides training to the IOFS officers in areas of technology, management, public administration as induction and re-orientation courses.

There were Ordnance Factories Institutes of Learning (OFILs) in Ambajhari, Ambernath, Avadi, Dehradun, Ishapore, Khamaria, Kanpur and Medak. Each OFIL was headed by a principal director, and NADP by a senior principal director. NADP provided training to Group A officers, whilst the other eight institutes imparted training to Group B and Group C employees of the ordnance factories. OFB had Regional marketing centres and Regional controllerates of safety as well.

=== Joint ventures ===
In 2017, the Department of Defence Production under the Ministry of Defence opened itself to for Joint Ventures with OFB and DRDO was also tasked with identifying their products and patents, with the scope of commercial production

==== Indo-Russia Rifles Private Limited (IRRPL), Amethi ====
A joint venture between Ordnance Factory Board (50.5%), Kalashnikov Concern (42%) and Rosonboronexport (7.5%) established to produce AK-203 (7.62×39mm) assault rifles intended for Indian Security Forces.

== Indian Ordnance Factories Service (IOFS) ==
The Indian Ordnance Factories Service (IOFS) is a civil service of the Government of India. IOFS officers are Gazetted (Group A) defence-civilian officers under the Ministry of Defence.

IOFS is a multi-disciplinary composite cadre consisting of technical – engineers (civil, electrical, mechanical, electronics), technologists (aerospace, automotive, marine, industrial/product design, computer, nuclear, optical, chemical, metallurgical, textile, leather) and non-technical/administrative (science, law, commerce, management and arts graduates). Technical posts account for about 87% of the total cadre. The doctors (surgeons and physicians) serving in OFB belong to a separate service known as the Indian Ordnance Factories Health Service (IOFHS). IOFHS officers are responsible for the maintenance of health of the employees, and the hospitals of OFB. They report directly to the IOFS officers. IOFS and IOFHS are the only two civil services under the Department of Defence Production.

== Products ==
The type of ordnance material produced is very diverse, including various small arms to missiles, rockets, bombs, grenades, military vehicles, armoured vehicles, chemicals, optical devices, parachutes, mortars, artillery pieces plus all associated ammunition, propellants, explosives and fuses.

=== Civilian products ===
Civilians are required to hold an Arms License (issued only for non-prohibited bore category weapons) in order to buy firearms in India. The following products of the Indian Ordnance Factories Board are available for civilians:

==== Arms ====
- IOF .22 revolver
- IOF .32 revolver (7.65 mm X 23)
- IOF .32 revolver Nirbheek
- IOF .32 pistol Ashani
- IOF .22 sporting rifle
- IOF .315 sporting rifle
- IOF .30-06 sporting rifle

==== Ammunition ====
- Cartridge Rimfire .22" Ball
- Cartridge SA .32" Revolver
- Cartridge SA .315" and .30-06 Ball
- Cartridge SA 12 Bore 70mm
- Cartridge SA 12 Bore 65 mm Special

=== Military Products ===
These products are exclusively manufactured for use by the armed forces and are not sold to civilians.

Infantry

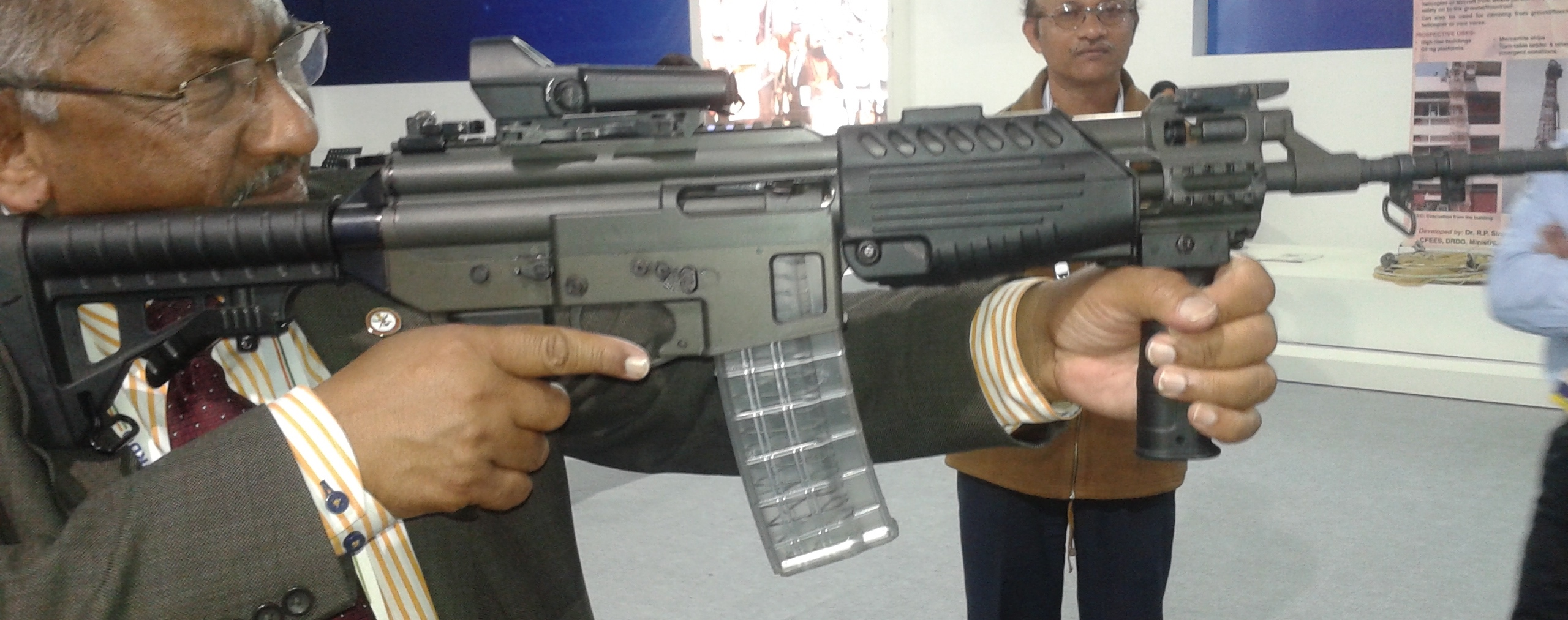
Multi Caliber Individual Weapon System (MCIWS) by OFT

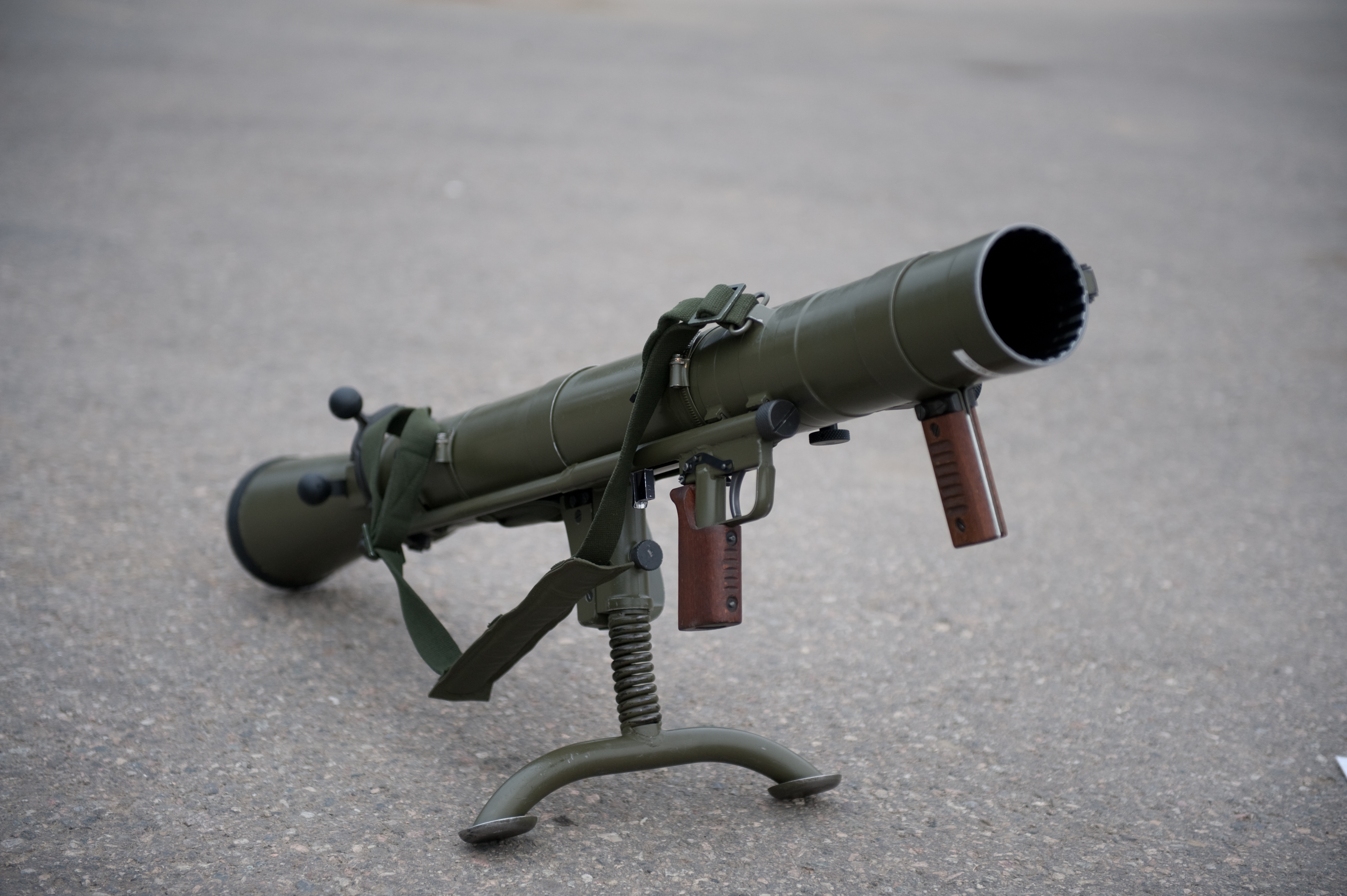
84mm Shoulder-fired Rocket Launcher / Recoilless Gun by OFT

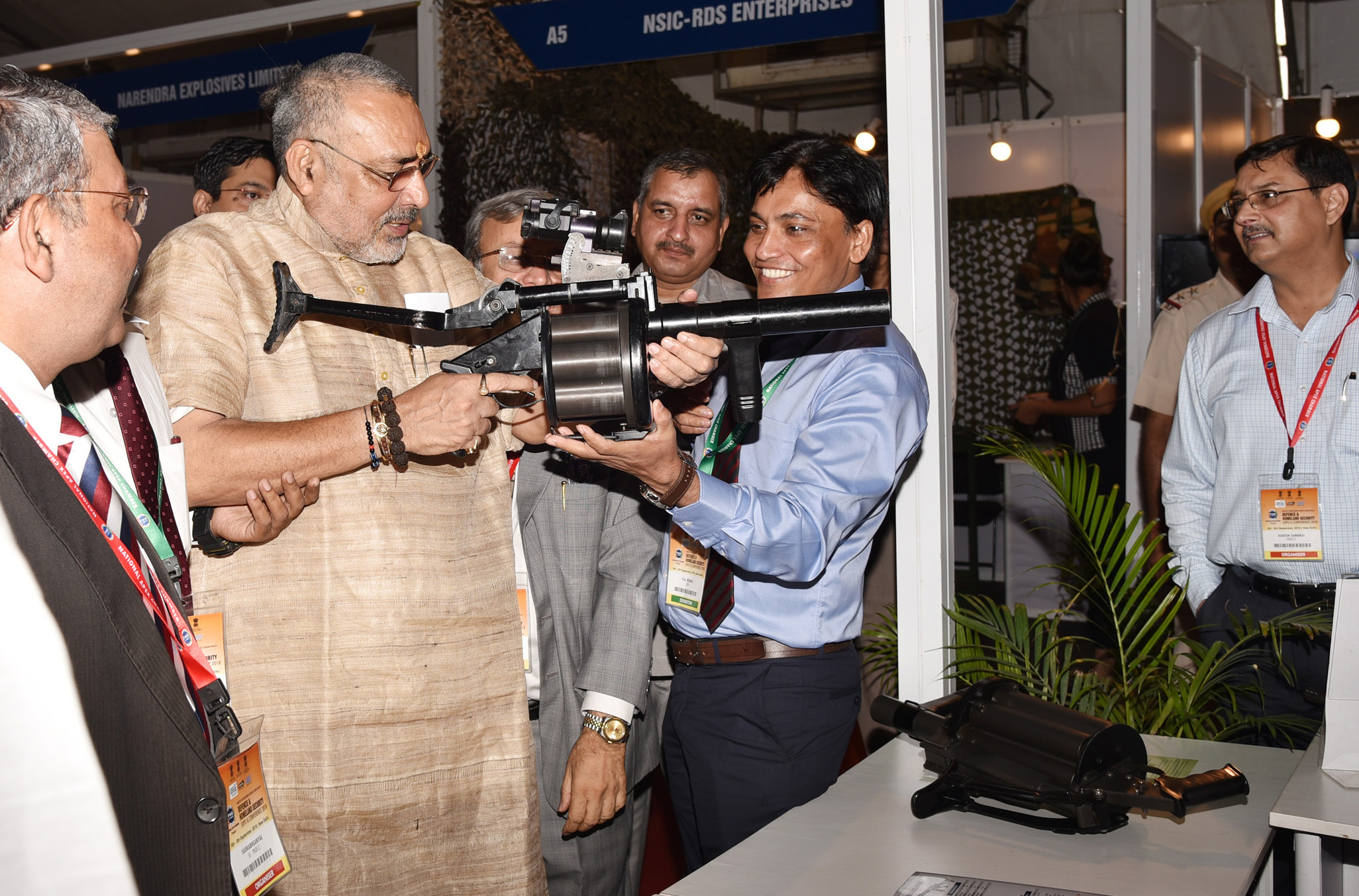
Minister holding a 40 mm Multi Grenade Launcher (MGL) and on the table the 38 mm Multi Shell Launcher both manufactured by OFT

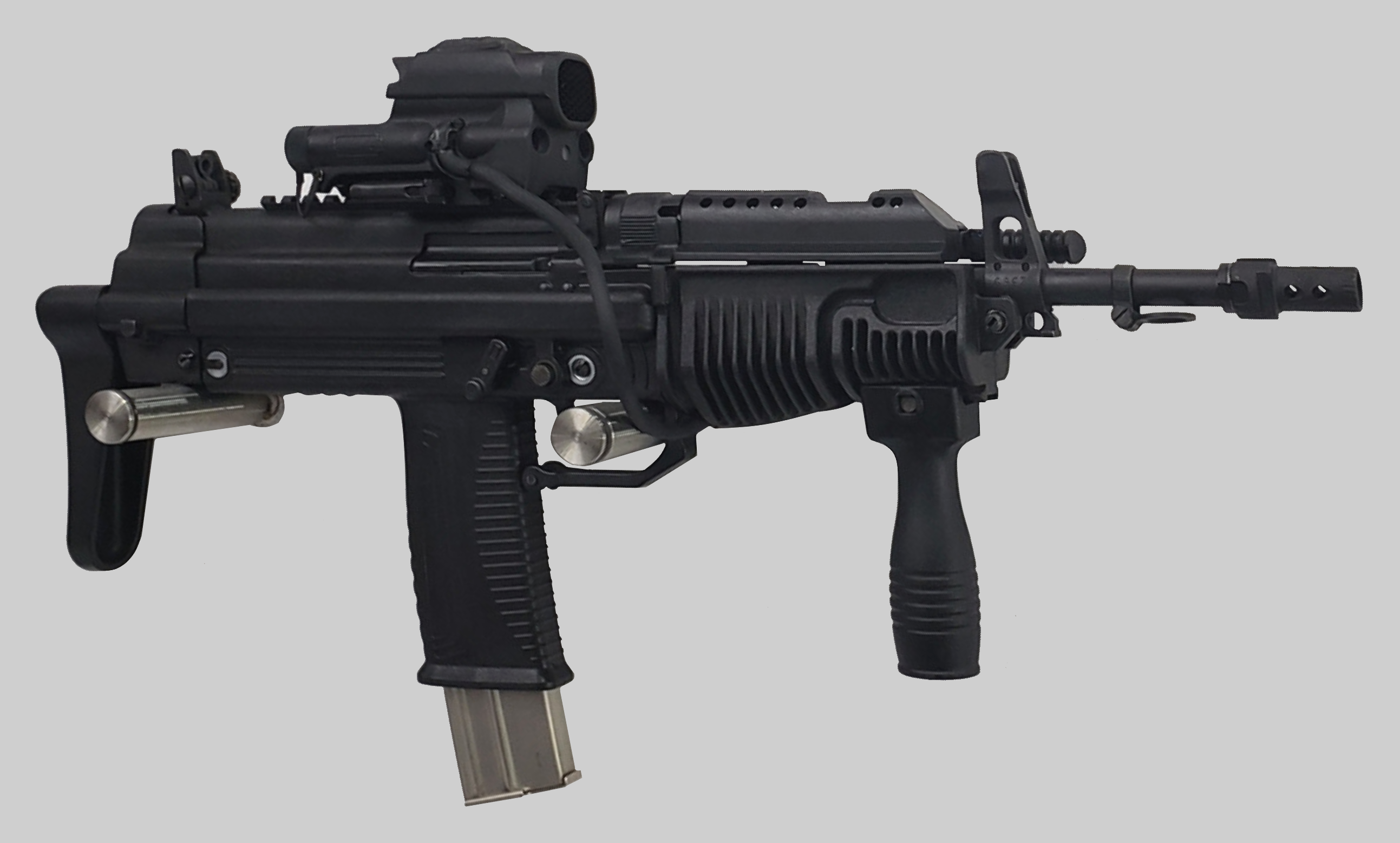
Joint Venture Protective Carbine (JVPC) to be manufactured by OFT

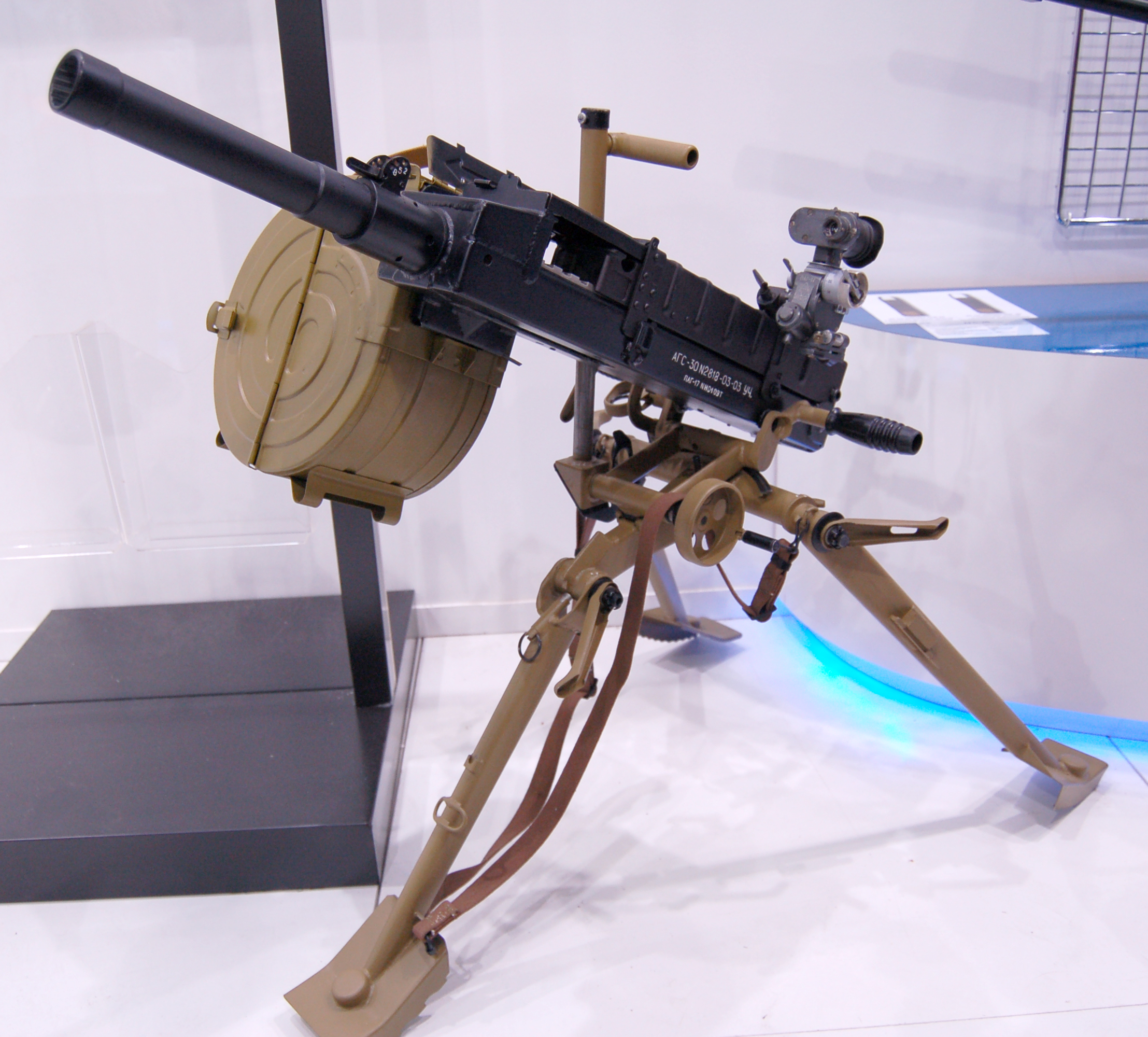
AGS-30 Automatic Grenade Launcher by OFT

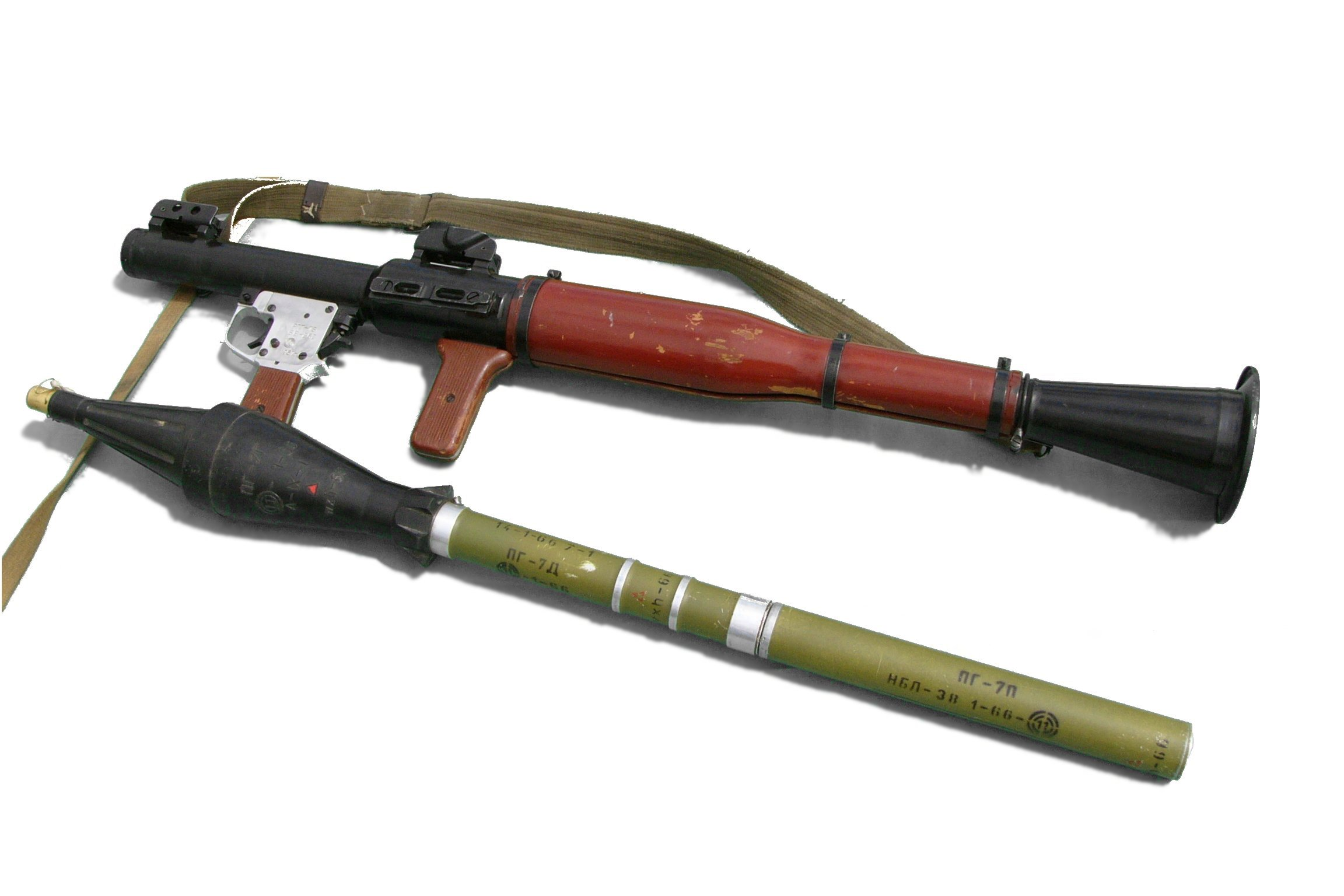
Rocket Propelled Grenade Launcher by OFT

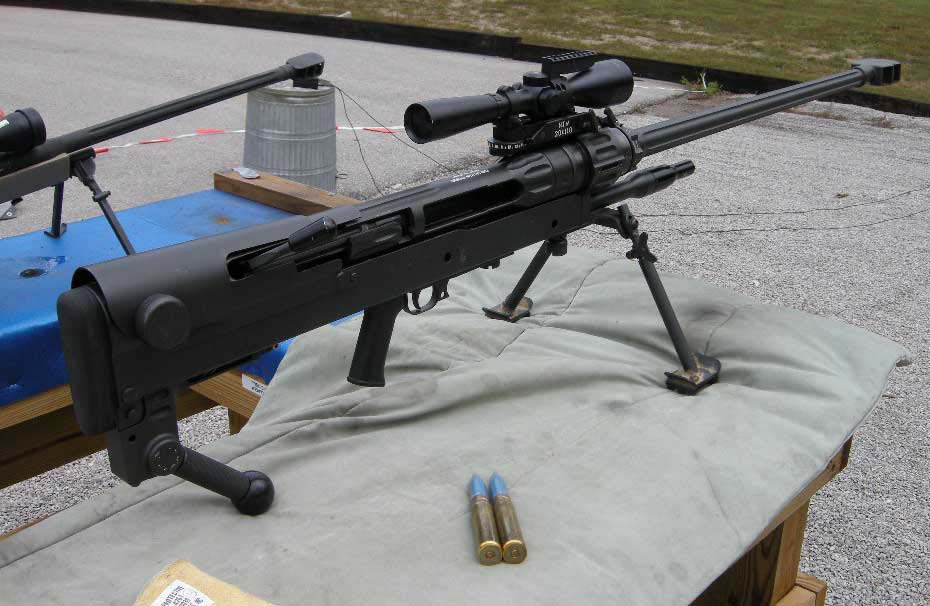
Vidhwansak Anti-material Sniper Rifle by OFT
Artillery

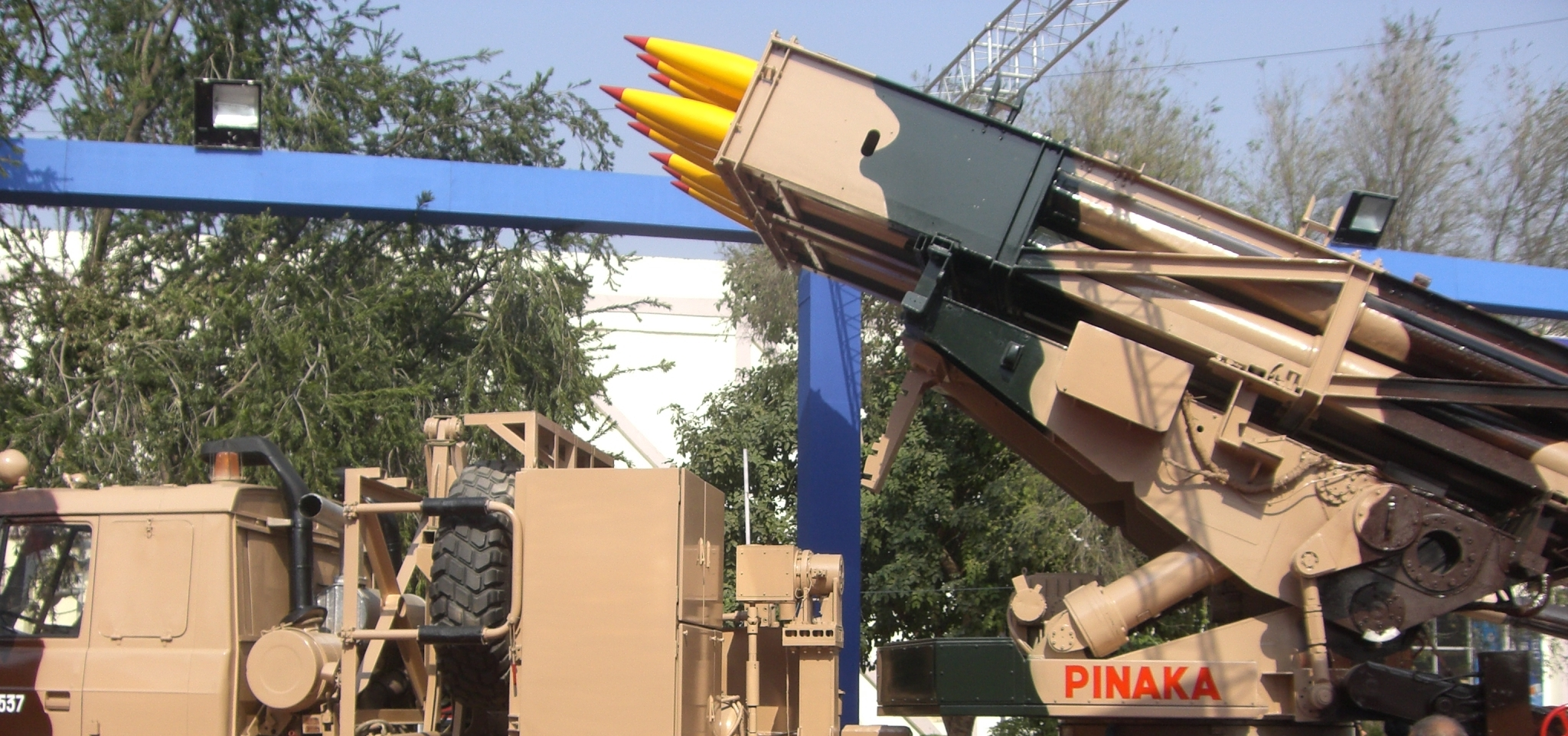
Pinaka rockets manufactured by OFAJ and the launcher by VFJ

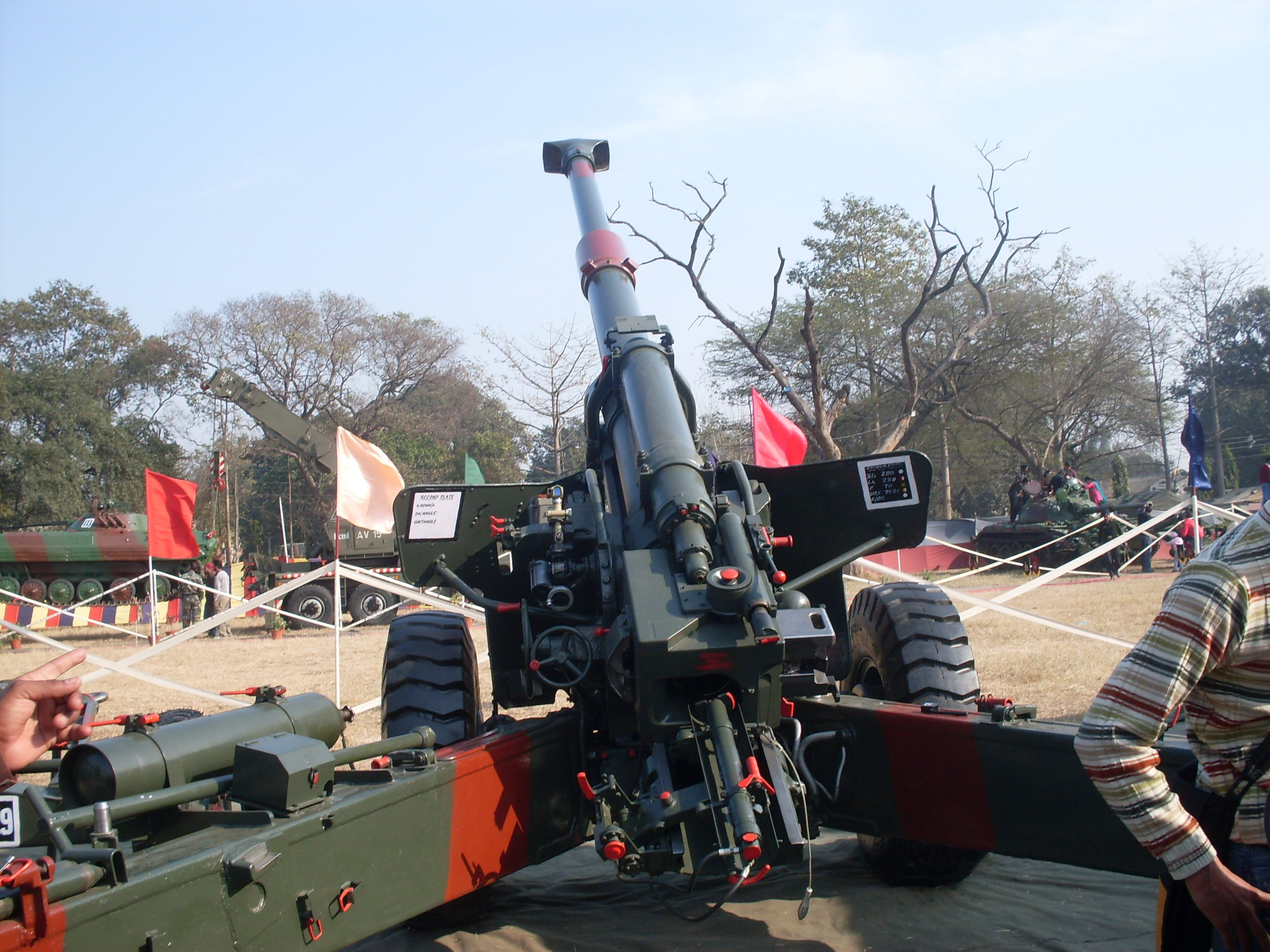
Dhanush 155 mm artillery gun in L39, L45 and L52 configurations by GCF

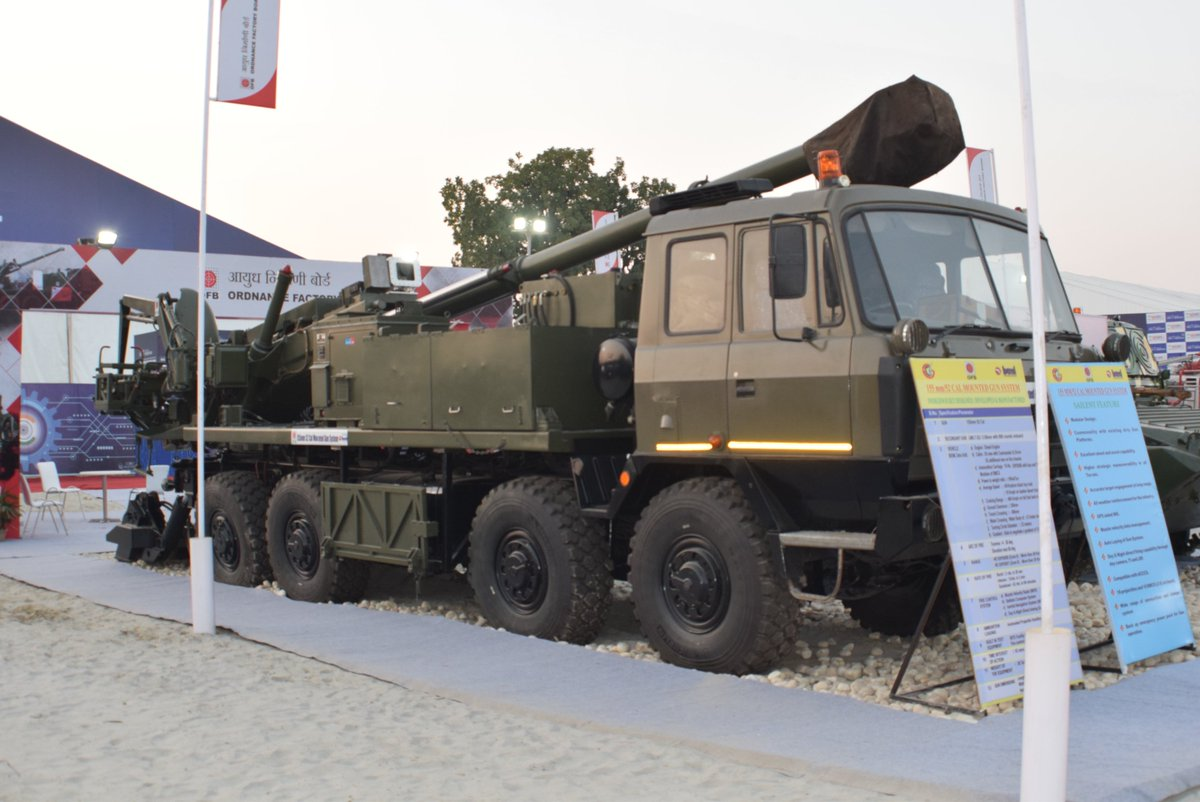
VFJ-GCF 8X8 155 mm Truck-mounted Self-Propelled Gun System

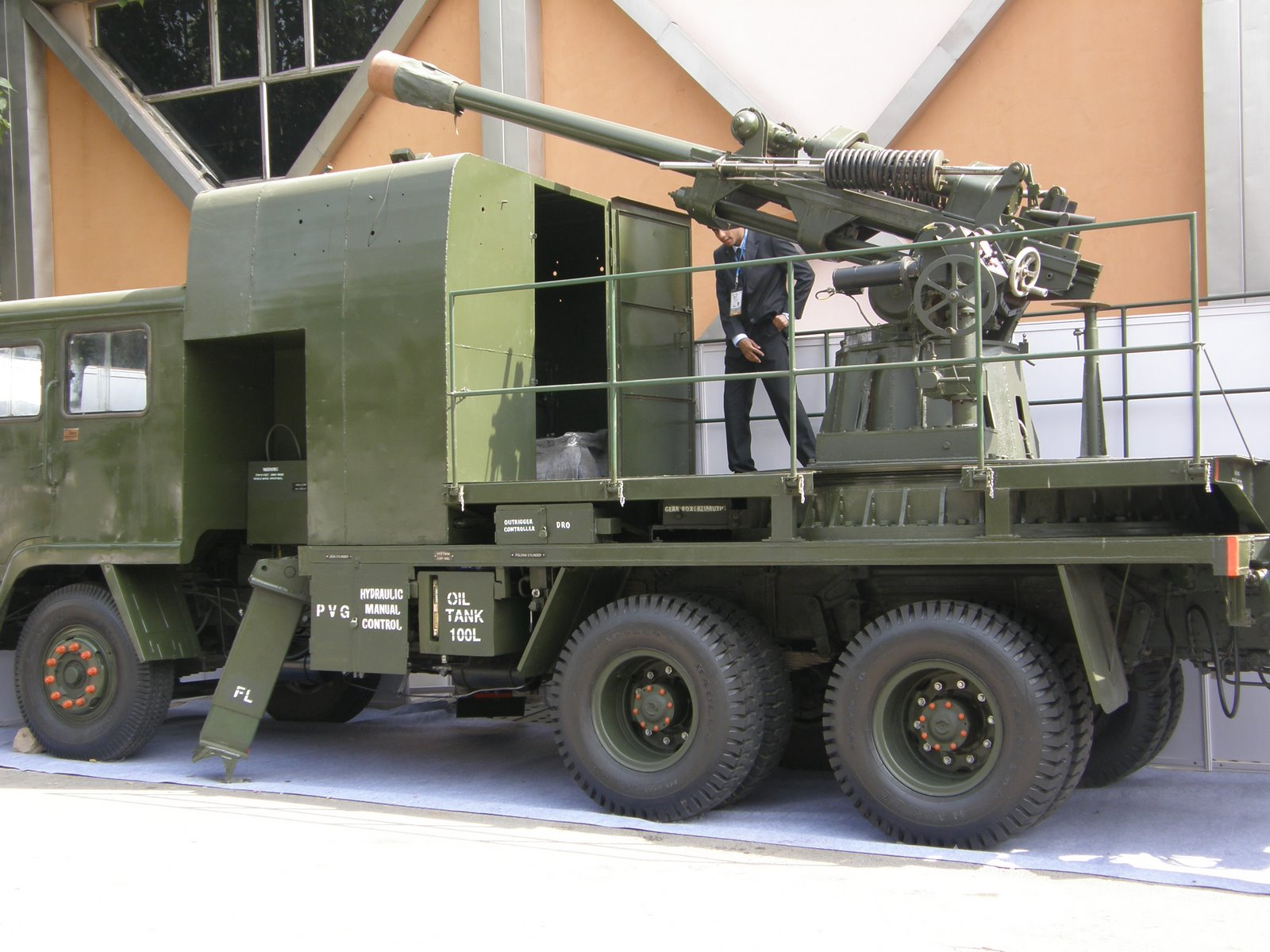
VFJ-GCF 105 mm Truck-mounted Self-Propelled Gun System, in 6X6 and 4X4 configurations

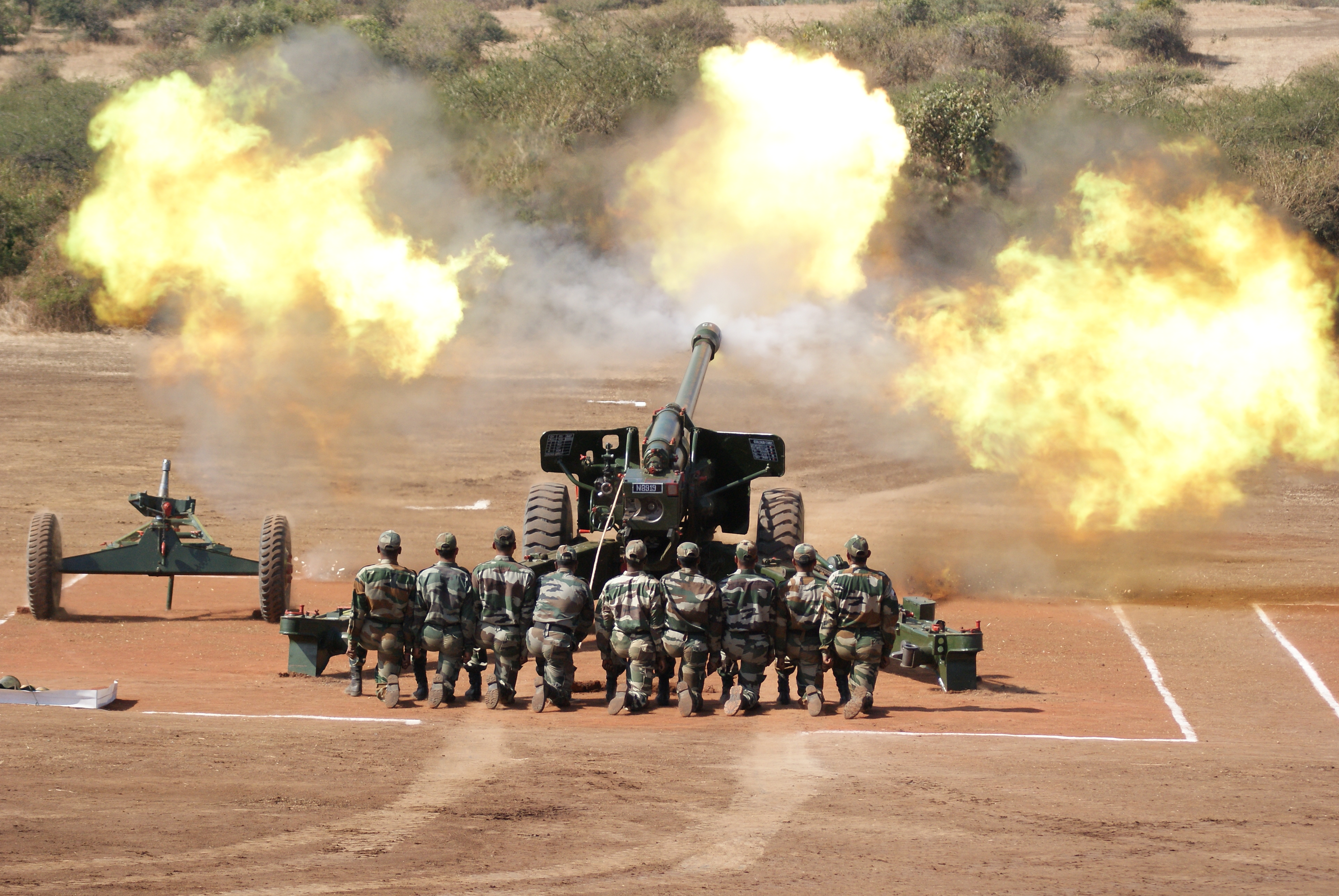
VFJ-GCF Sharang Towed Gun

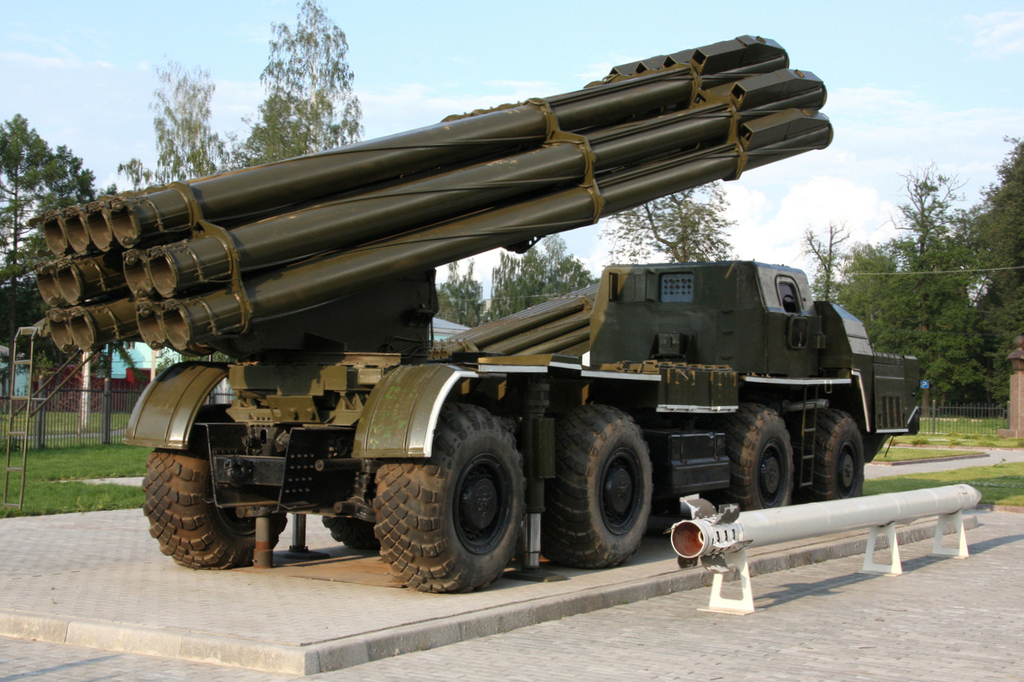
Smerch rockets produced at OFAJ and launcher at VFJ
Vehicles

Matang was completely developed and manufactured by VFJ.

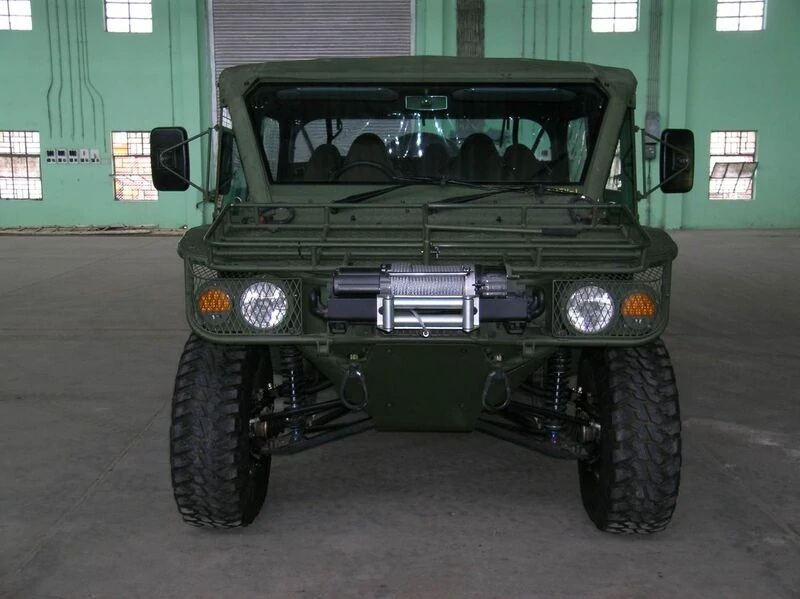
VFJ Flyer Light Strike Vehicle

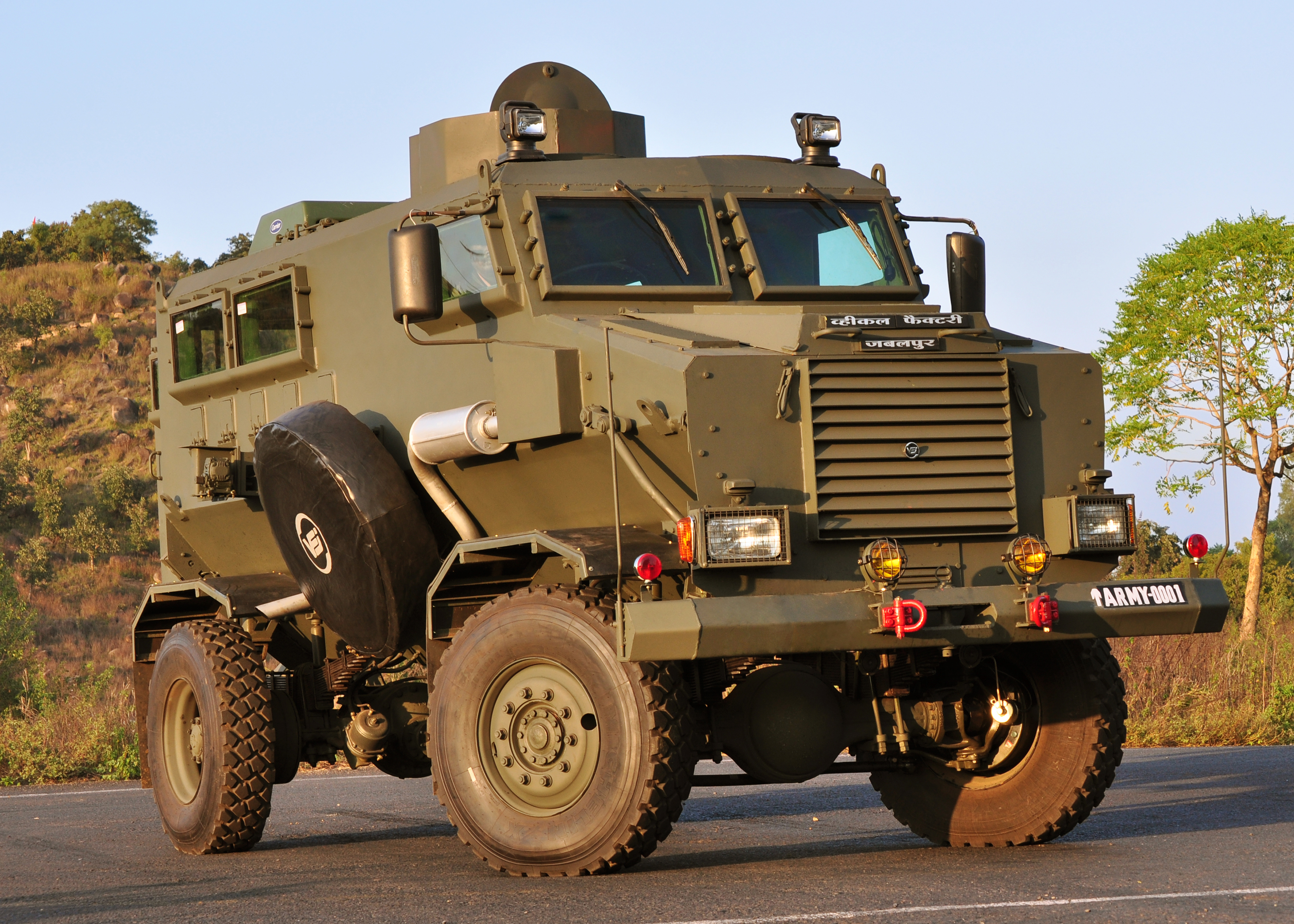
4X4 Mine Protected Vehicle, also in 6X6 configuration, with RCWS, recce and recovery variants

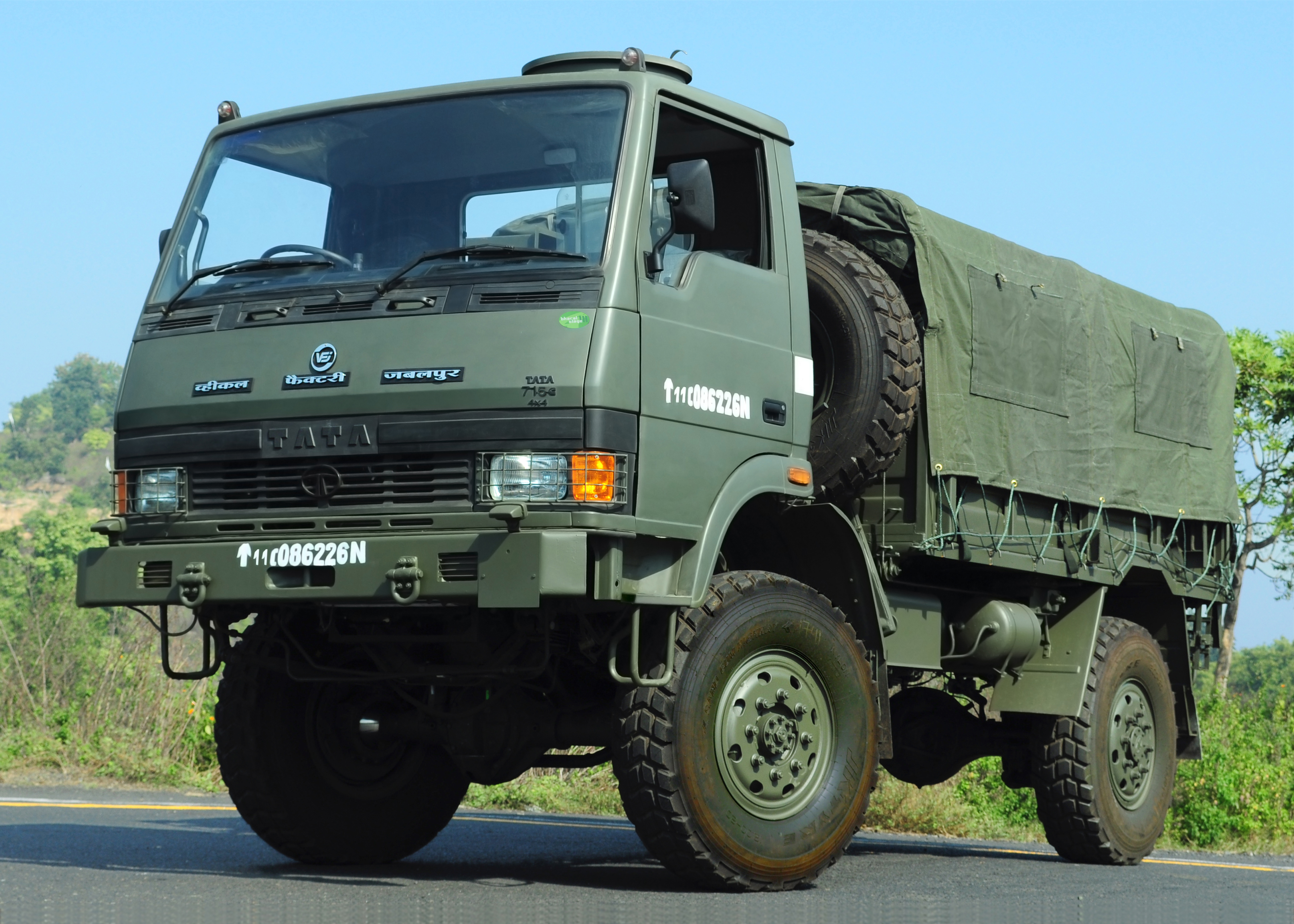
VFJ LPTA 715

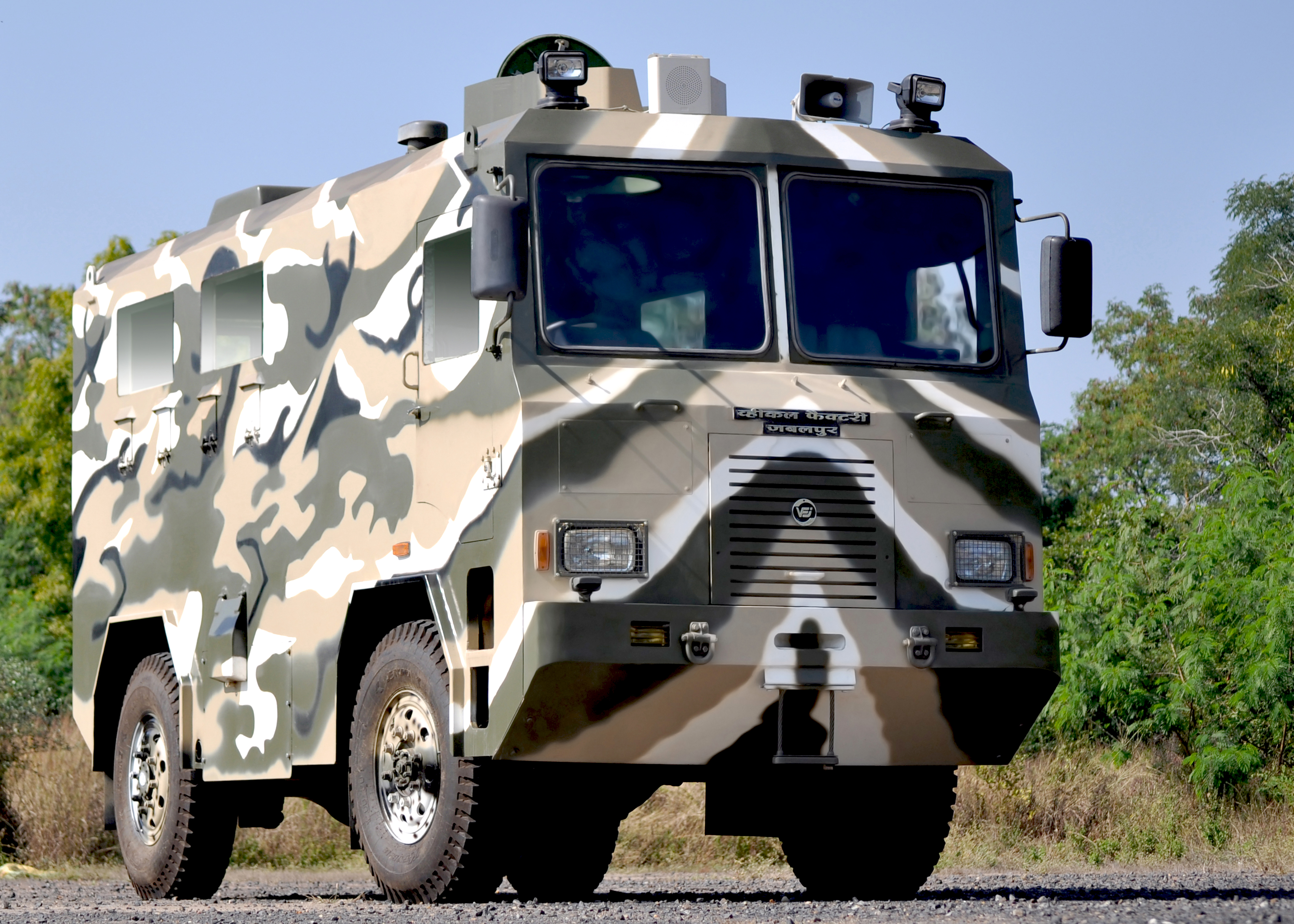
VFJ 4X4 Bullet Proof Vehicle

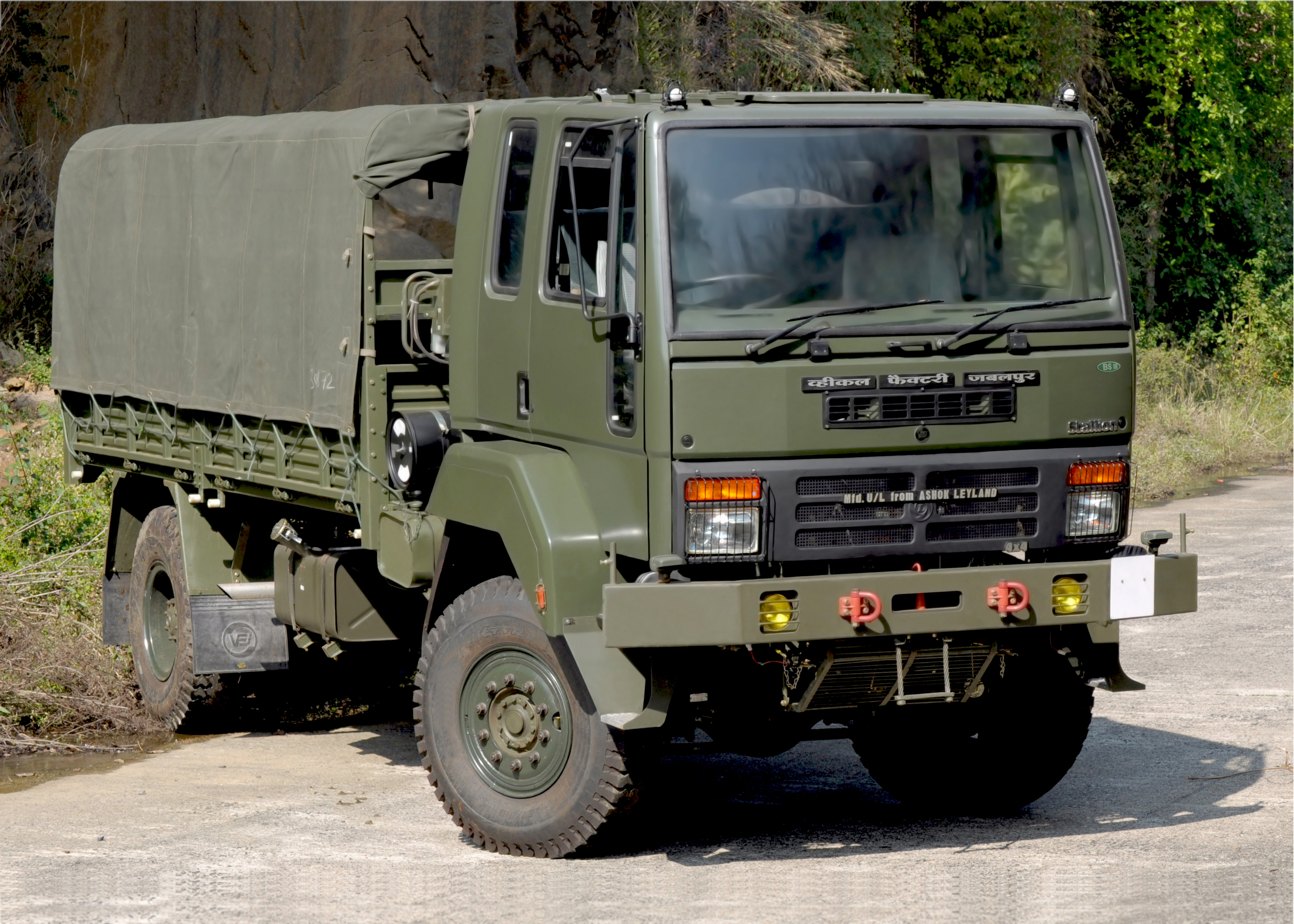
VFJ Stallion Mark I, now being replaced by Stallion Mark IV
Clothing

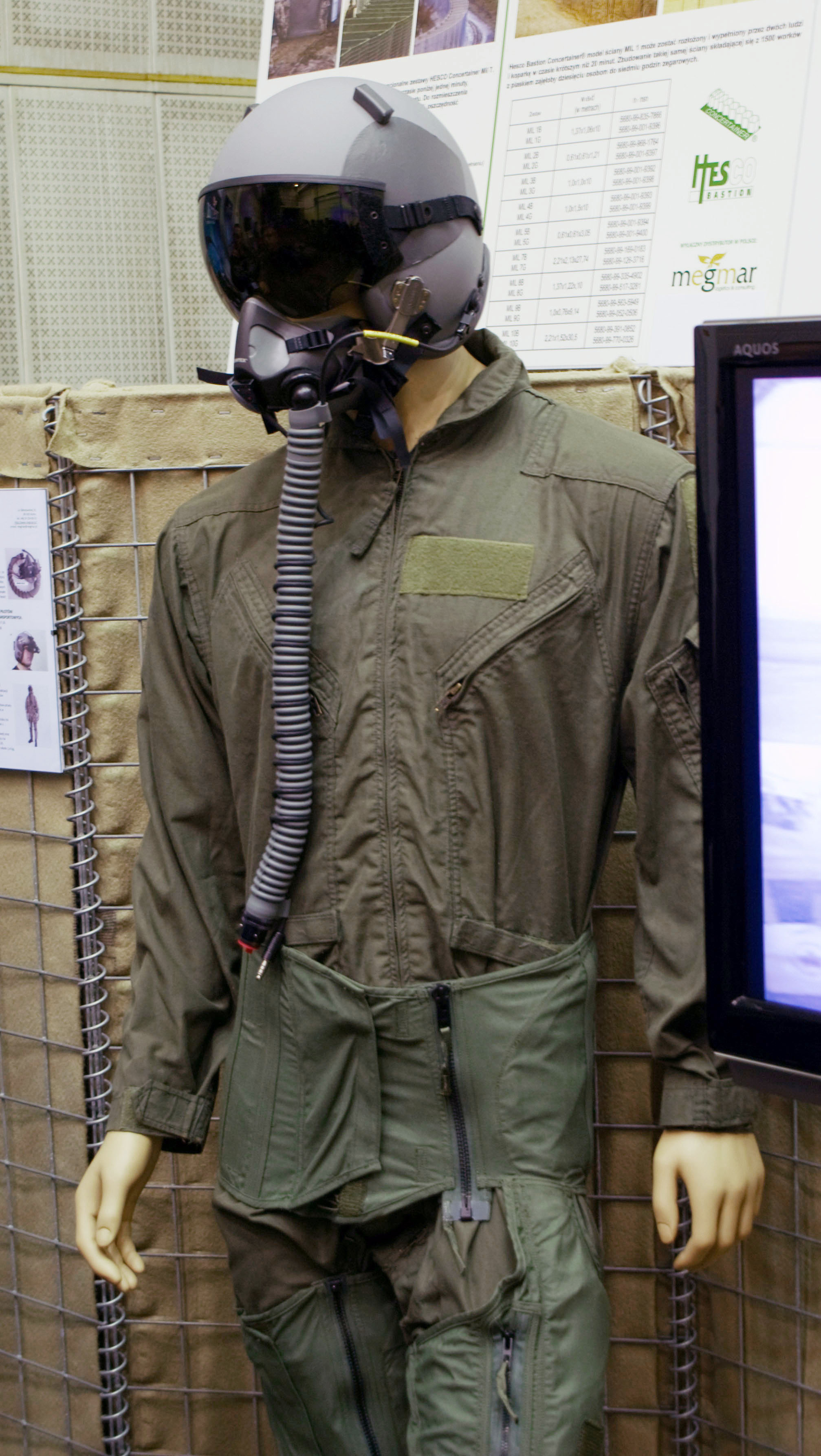
g-suits for Indian Air Force pilots flying the supersonic aircraft

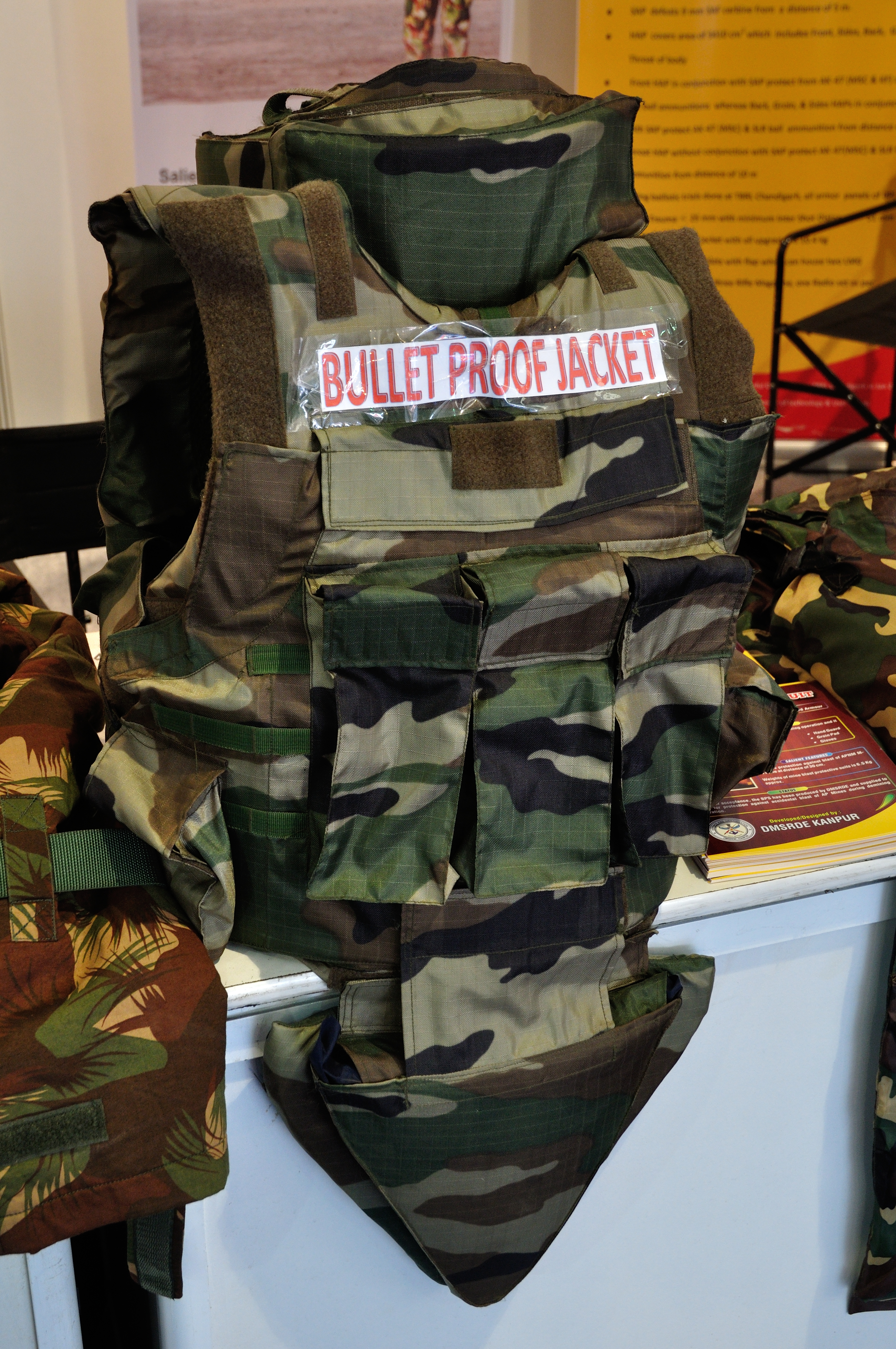
Bulletproof Vest

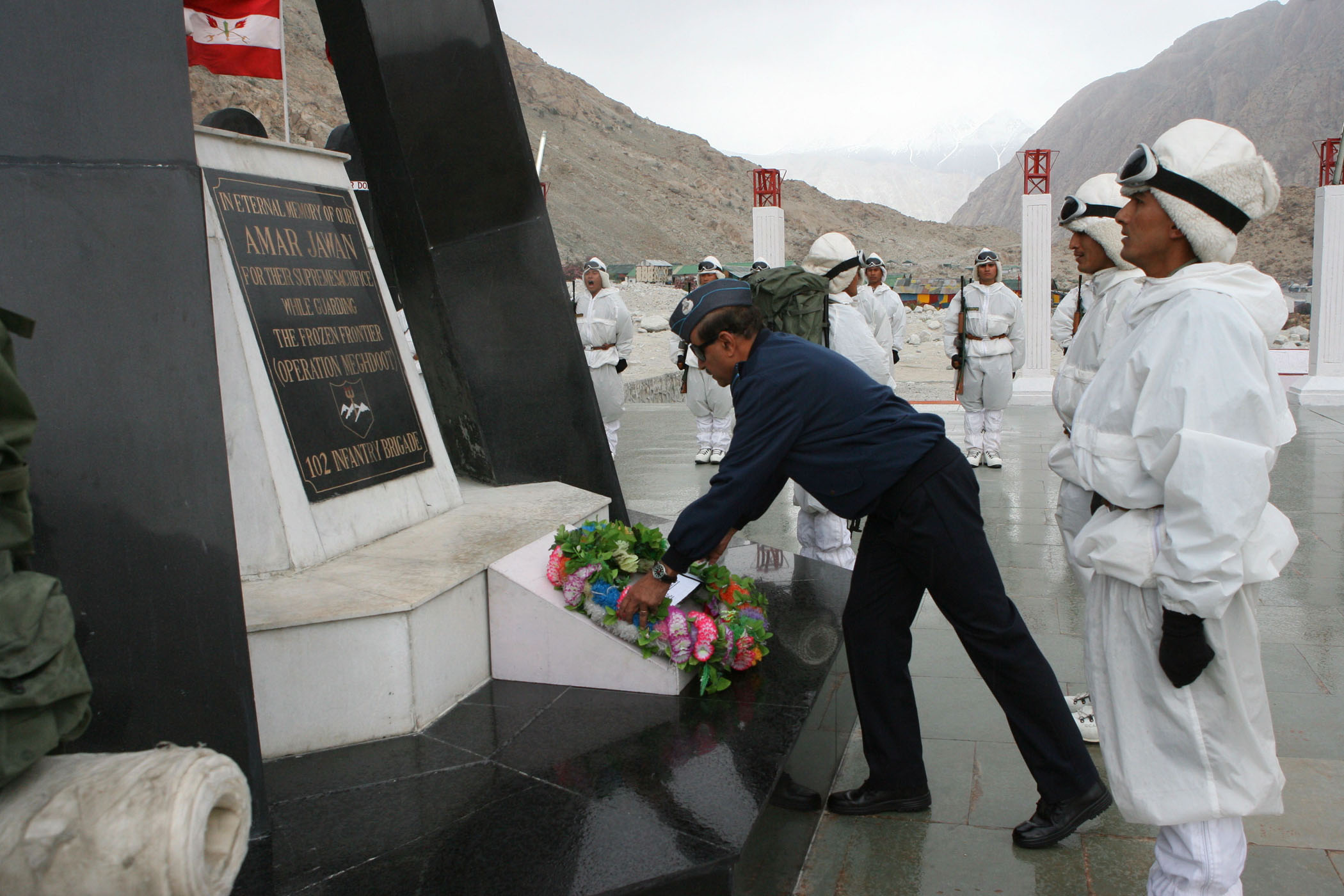
High-altitude, low-temperature, waterproof combat uniforms

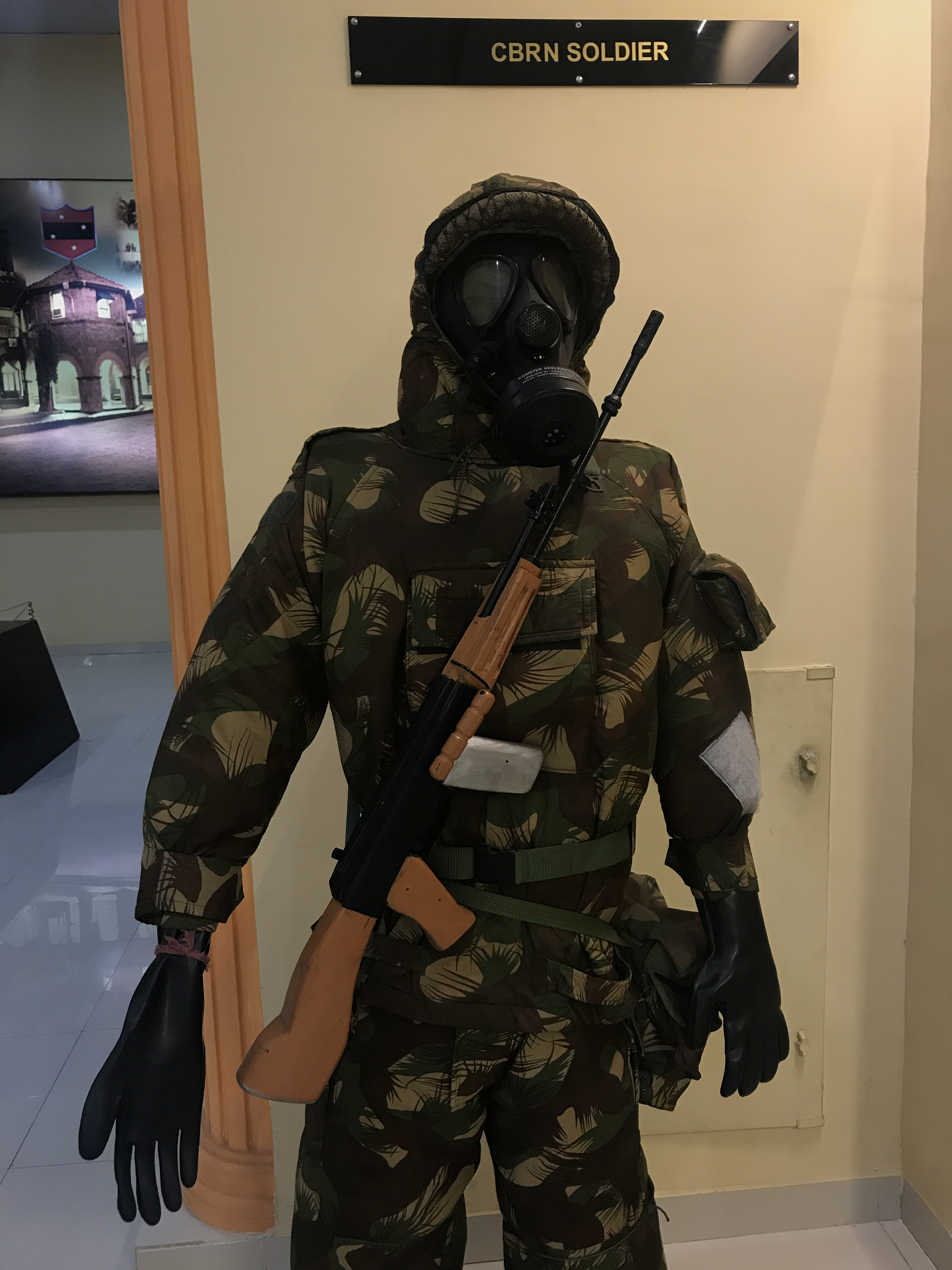
Chemical, biological, radiological and nuclear (CBRN) suit
Support equipment

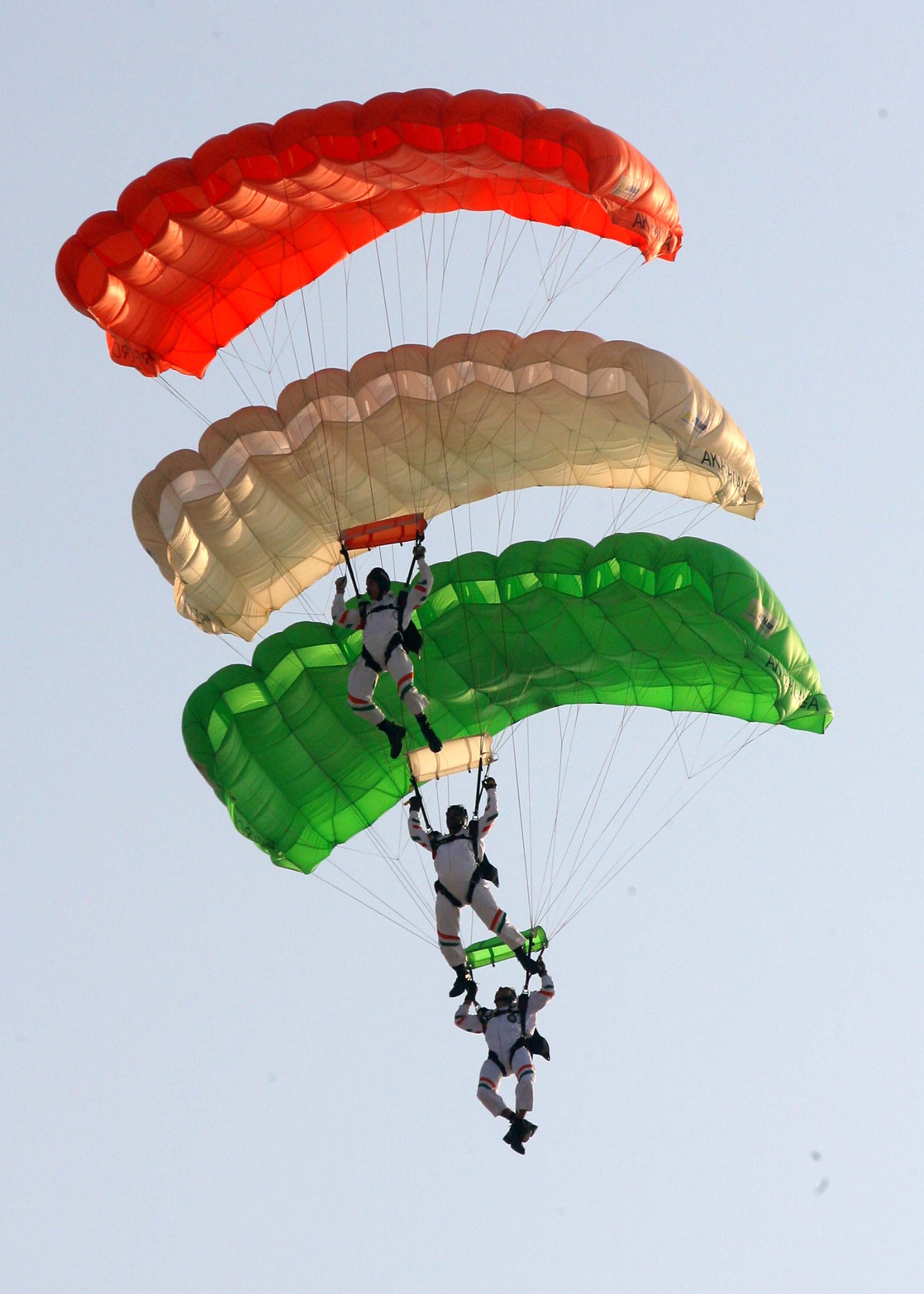
Parachutes manufactured at OPF Kanpur

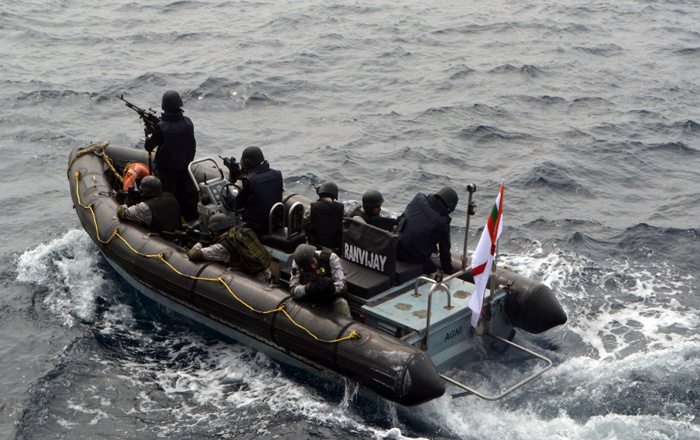
Inflatable boat Prashant manufactured at OPF Kanpur

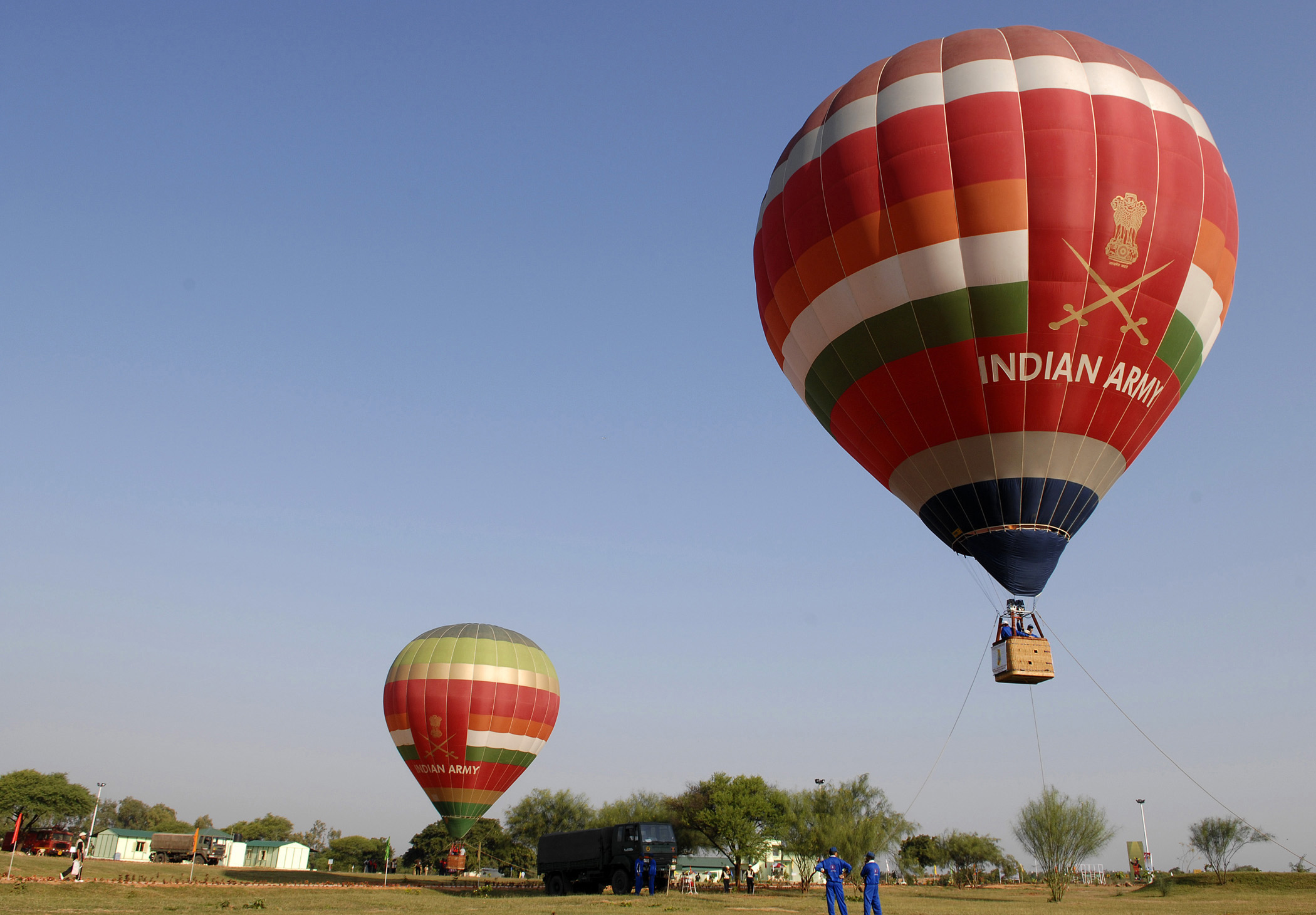
Hot air balloons manufactured at OEF Hazratpur
Armoured

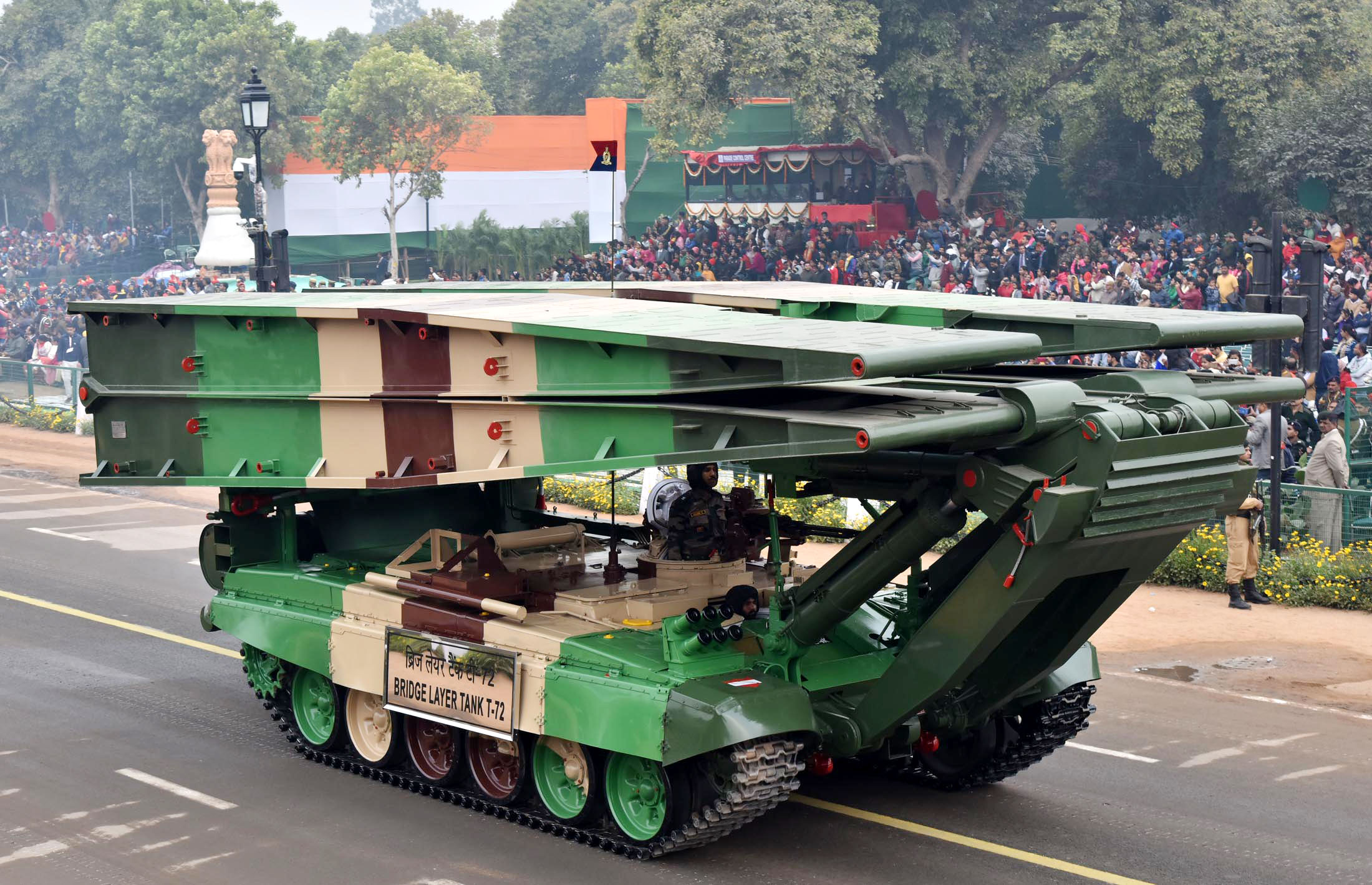
Bridge Layer Tank manufactured by HVF Chennai

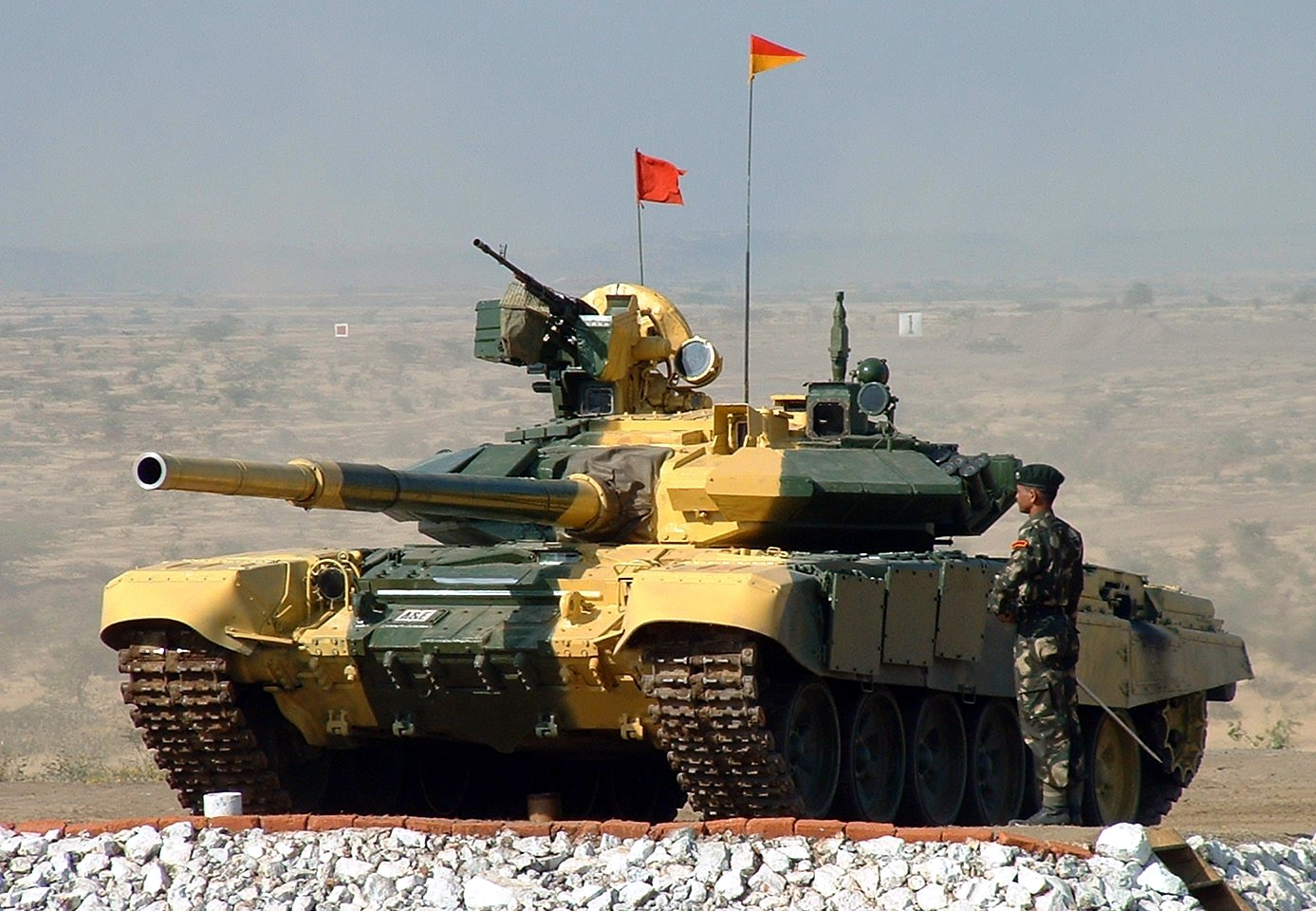
T-90 Bhishma tank built at HVF Chennai

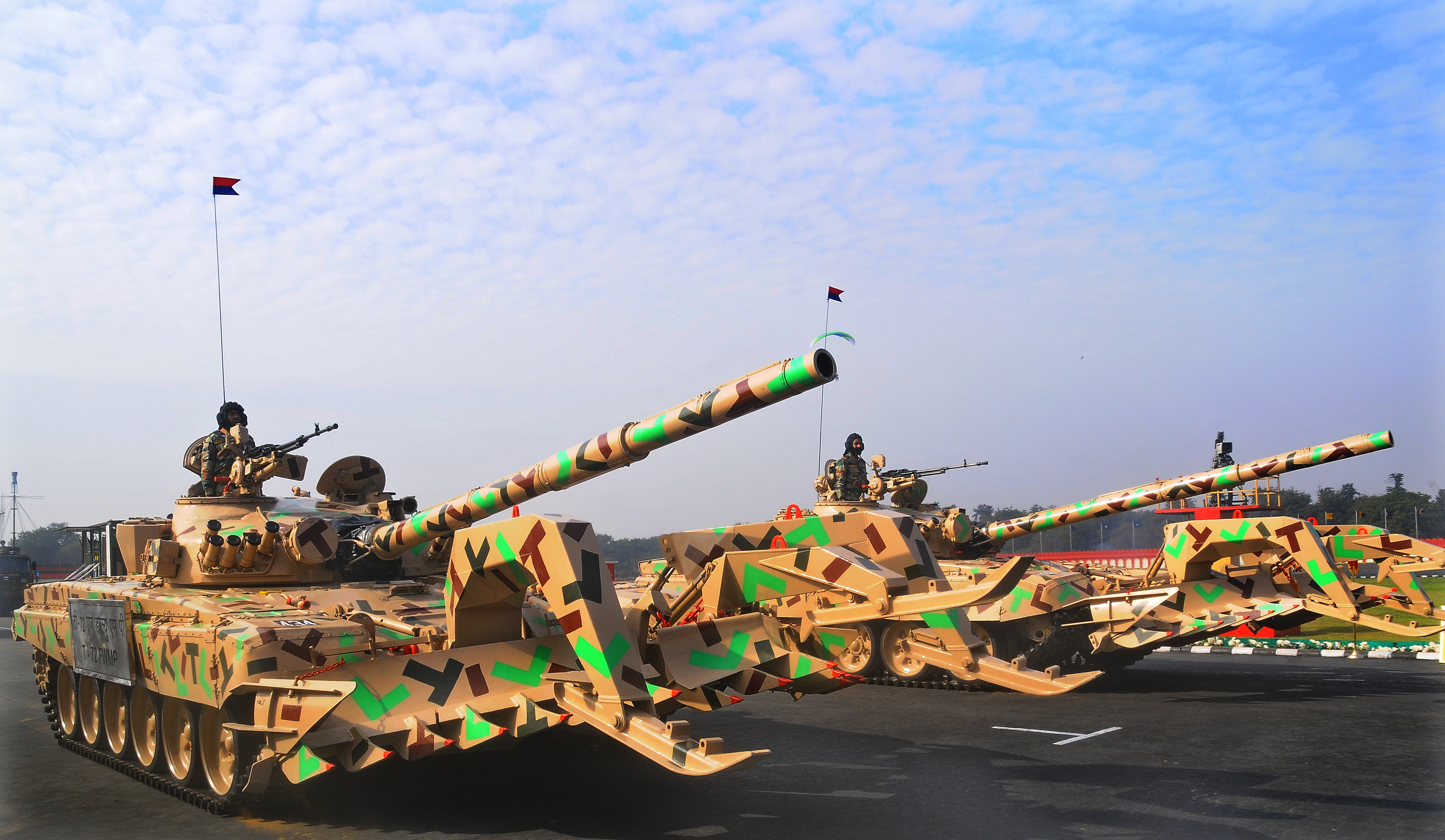
Full-width mine plough built by HVF Chennai

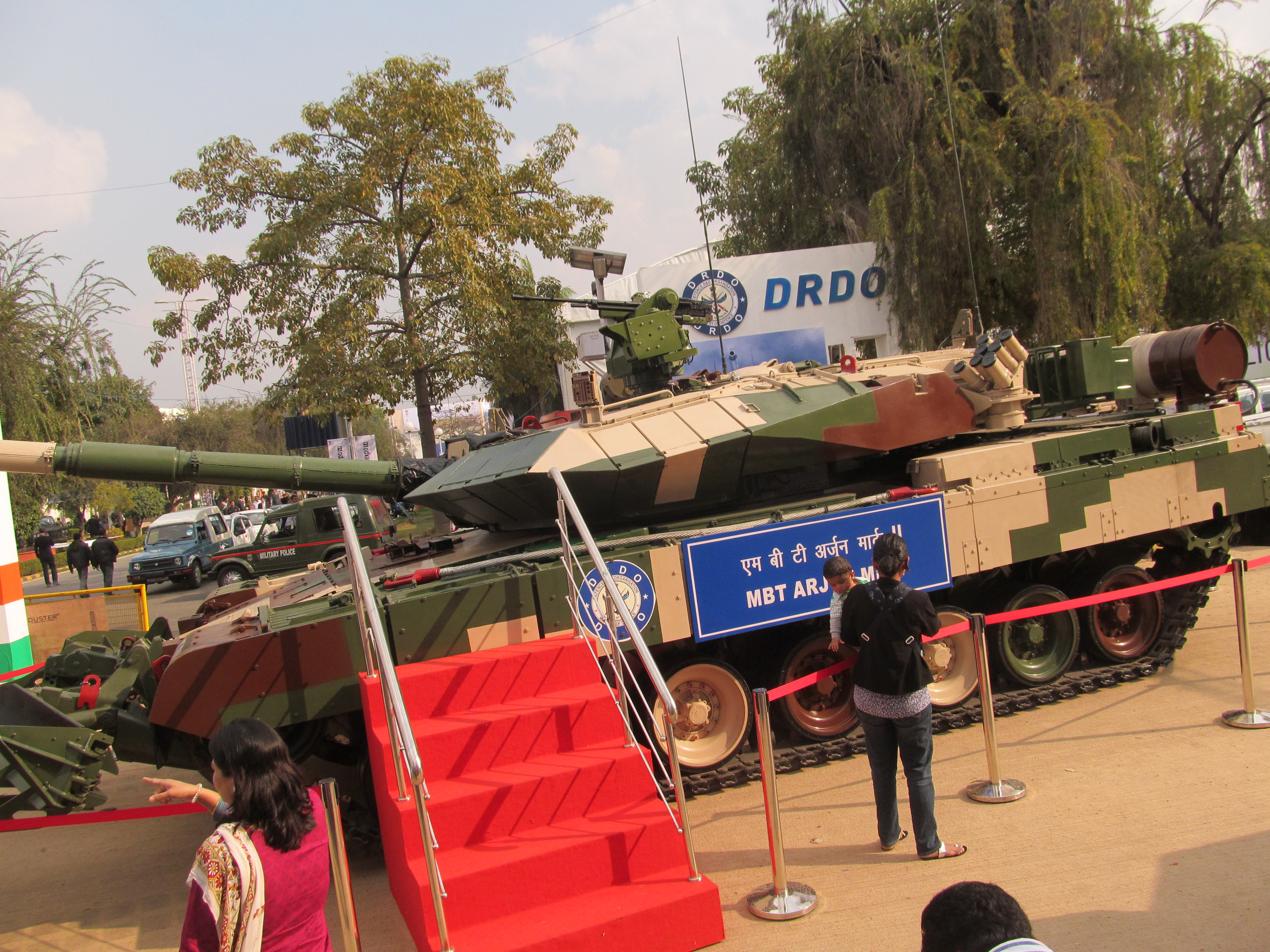
Arjun Mark-II tank

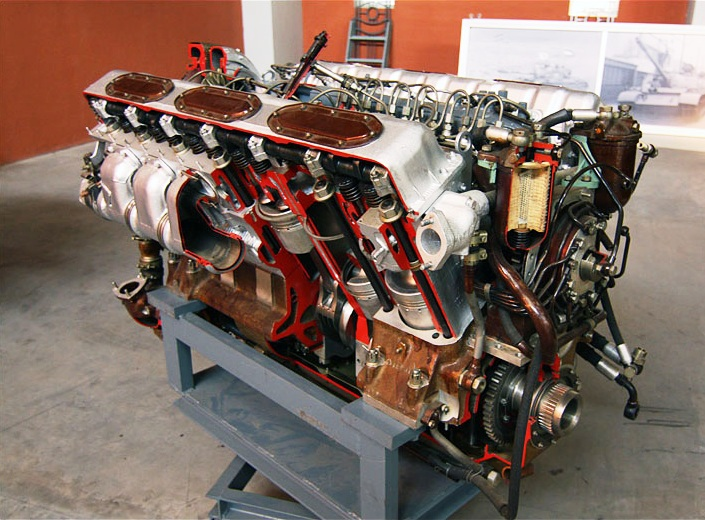
Bhishma's engine at Engine Factory Avadi, Chennai

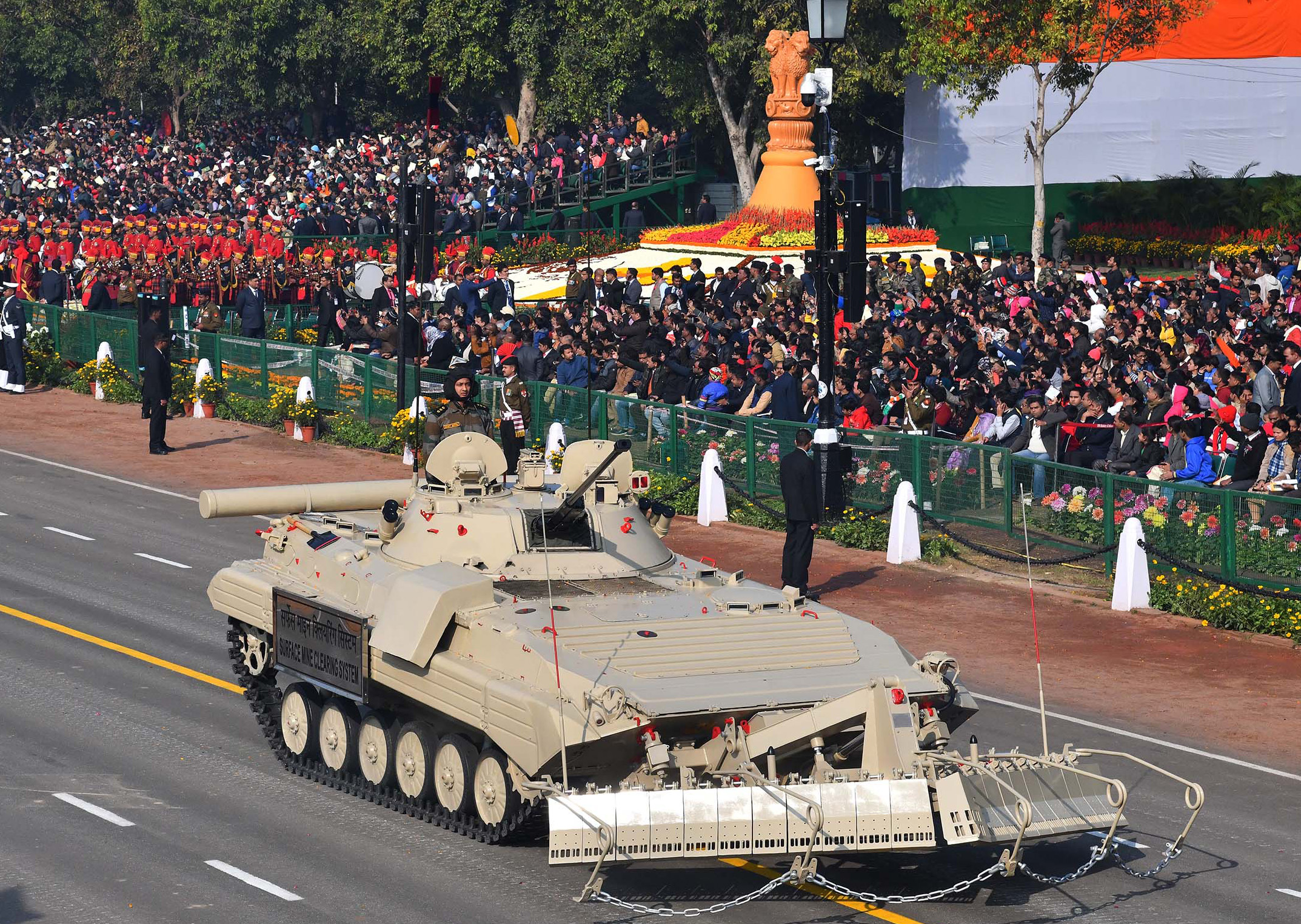
Surface Mine Clearing System manufactured by Ordnance Factory Medak
Missiles

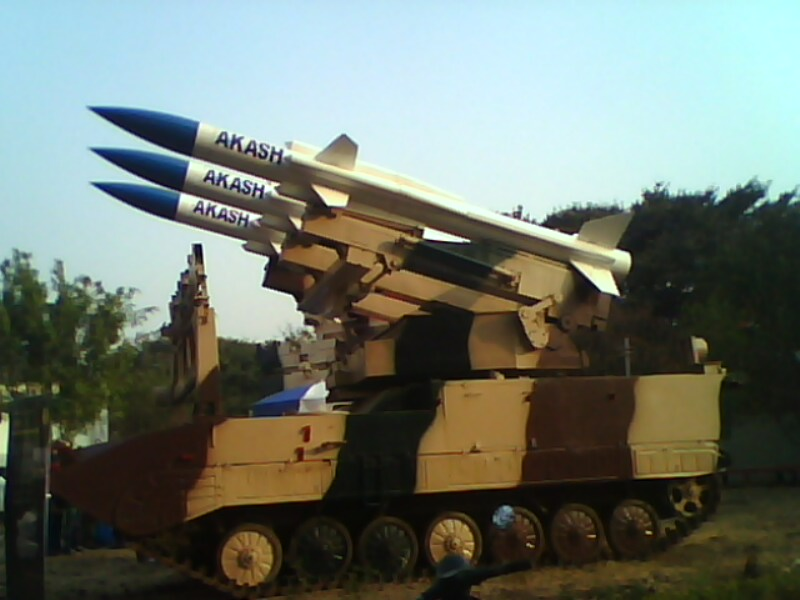
Akash missile's warhead, propellants and its launchers on Ajeya and Sarath

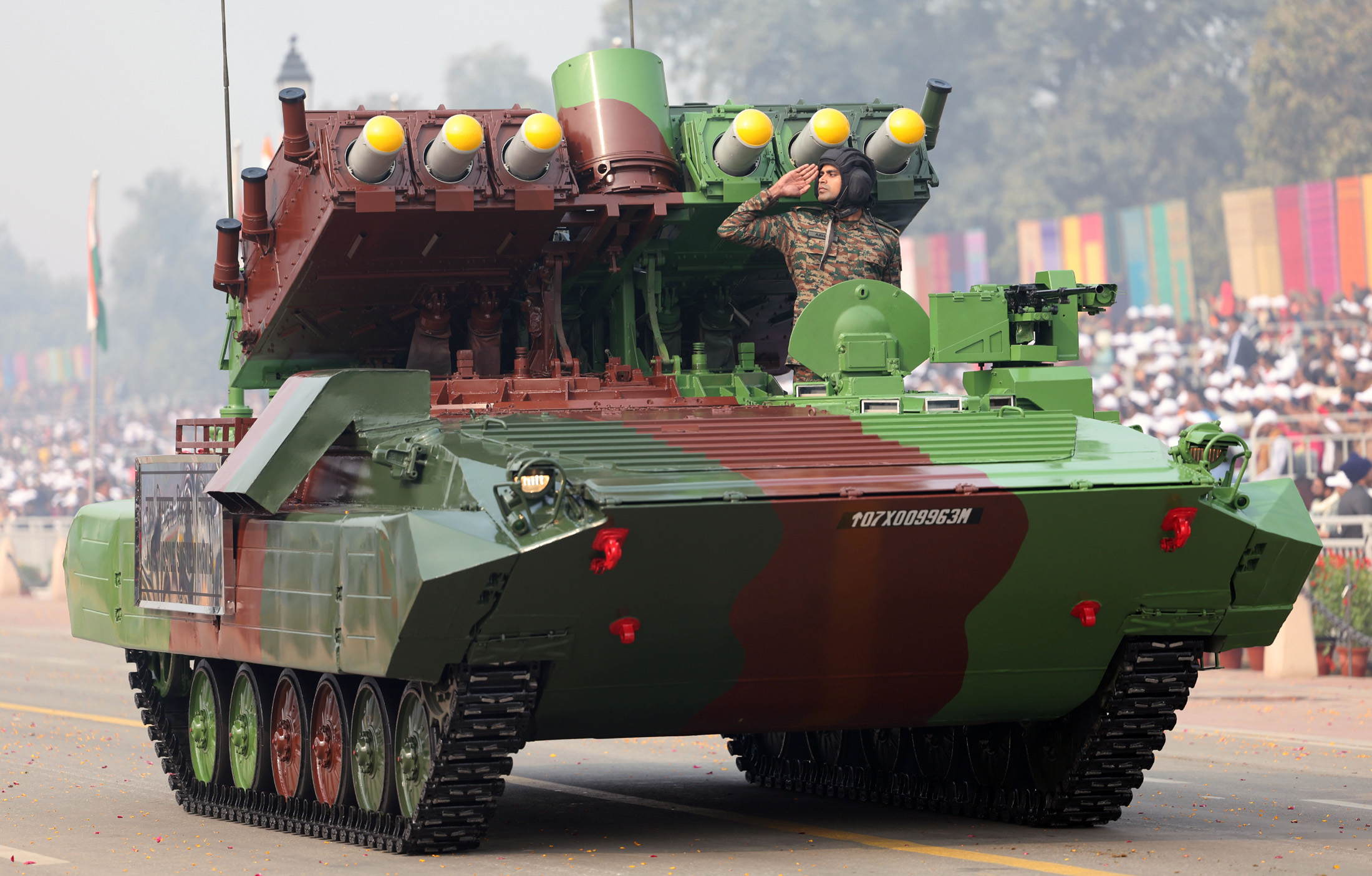
Nag missile carrier (Namica) with propellants and explosives for the Nag anti-tank guided missile (ATGM)

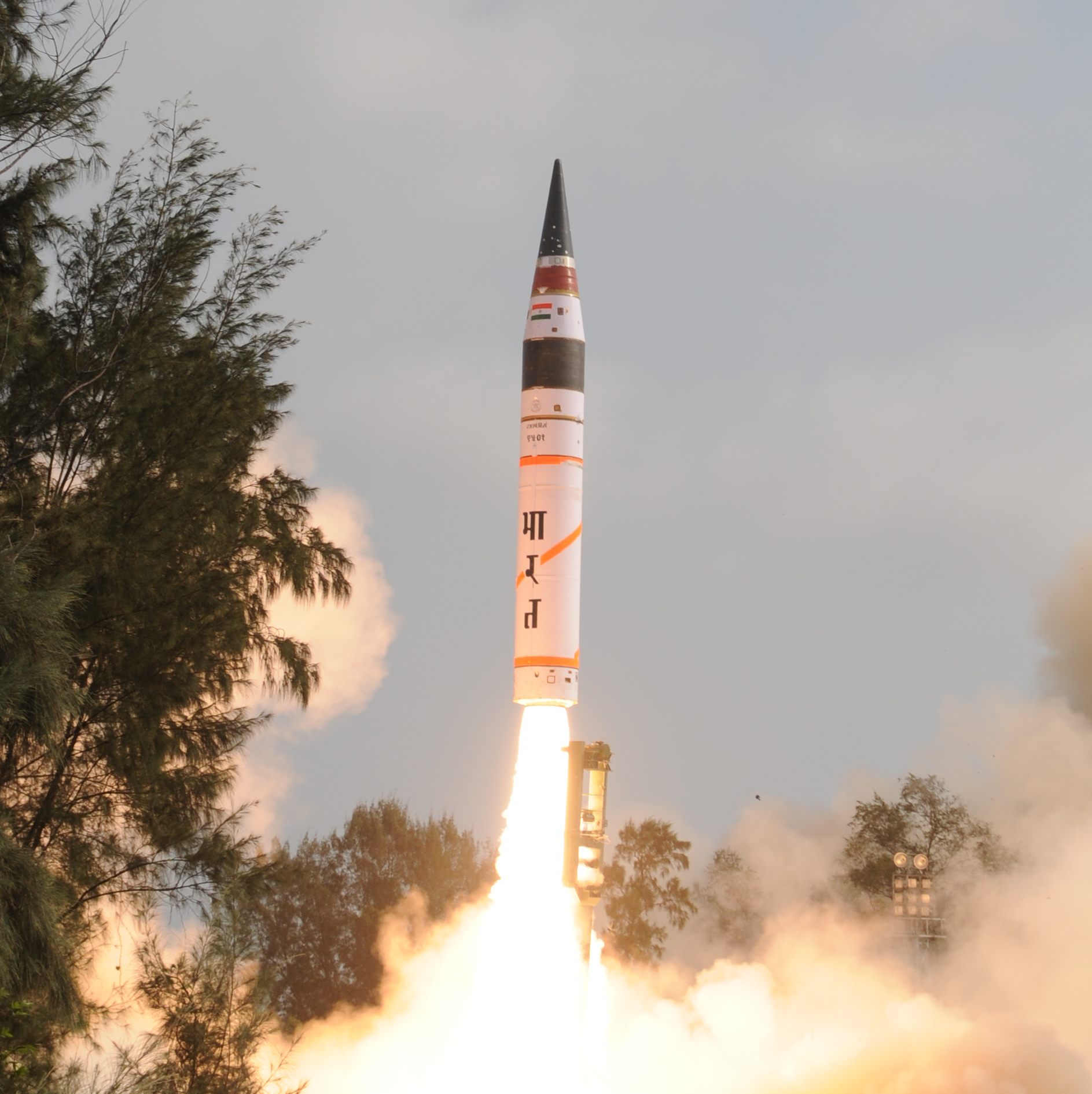
Propellants for the Agni missile series

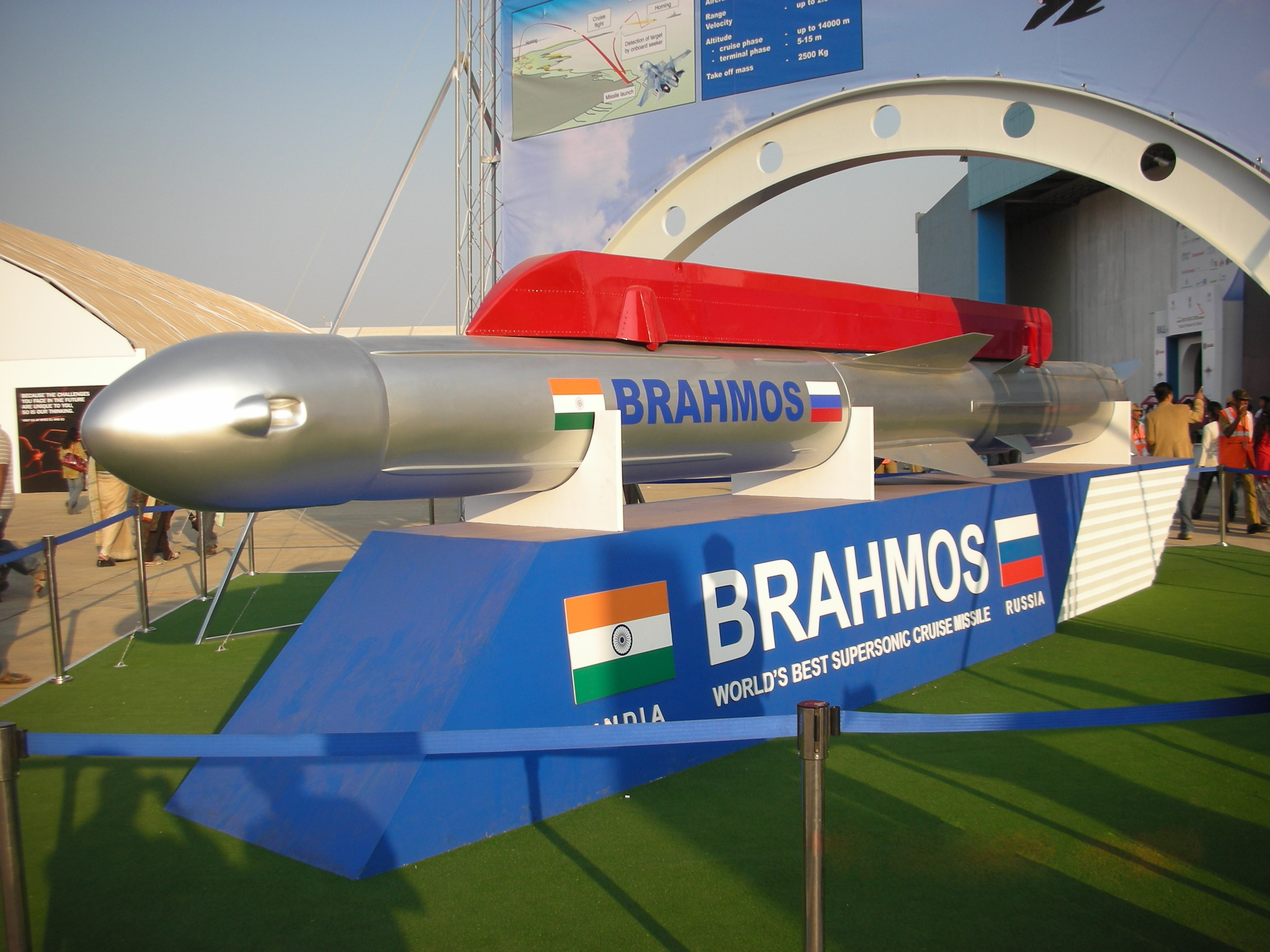
Explosive warheads and propellants for the BrahMos cruise missiles

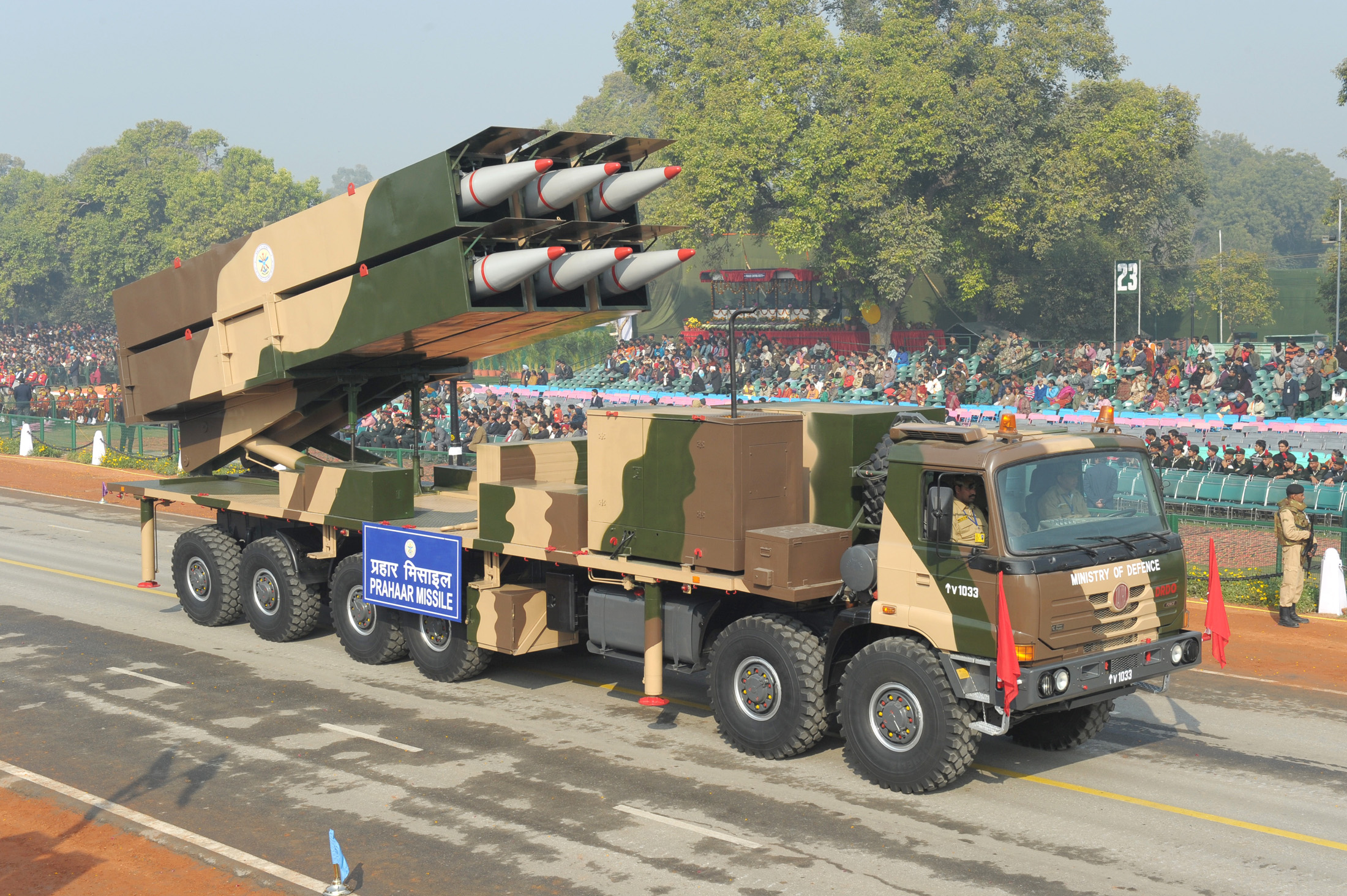
Propellants and explosives for the Prahaar missile
Space applications

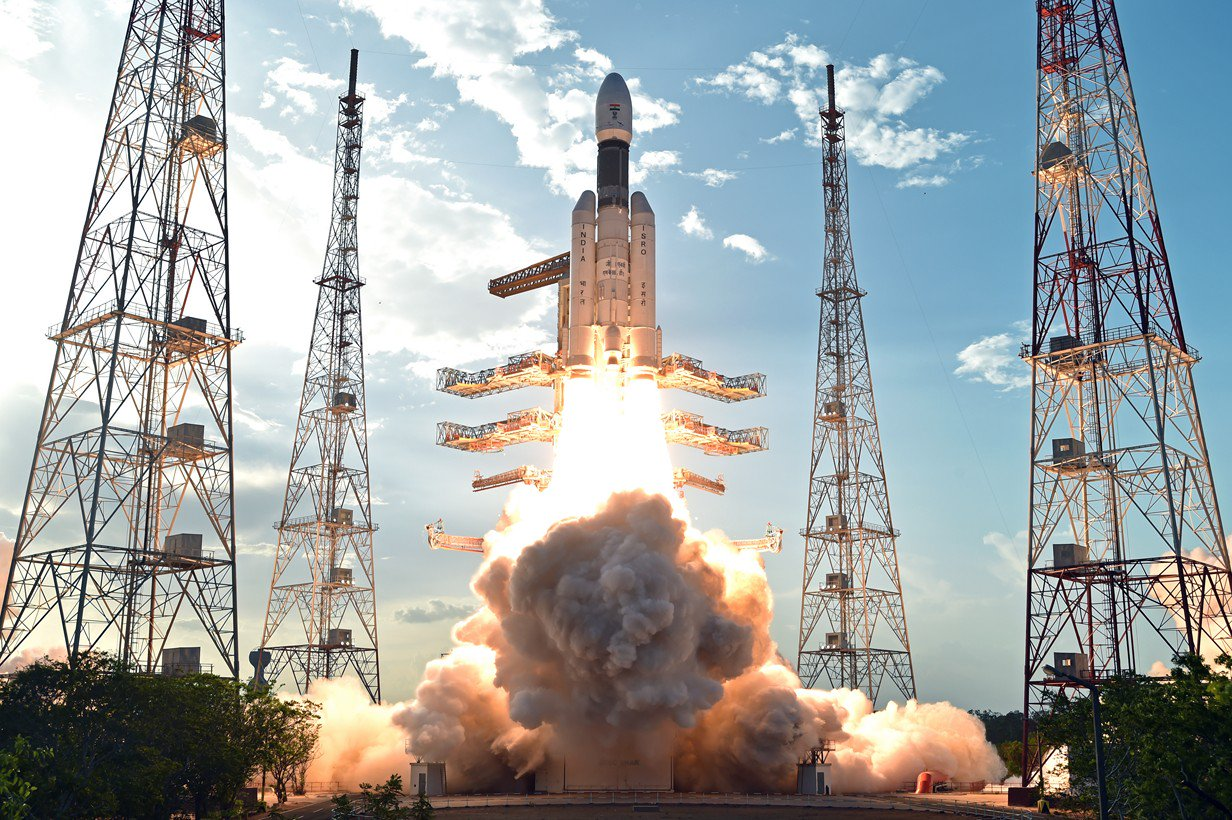
Explosives used in stage separation of GSLV are provided by OFB

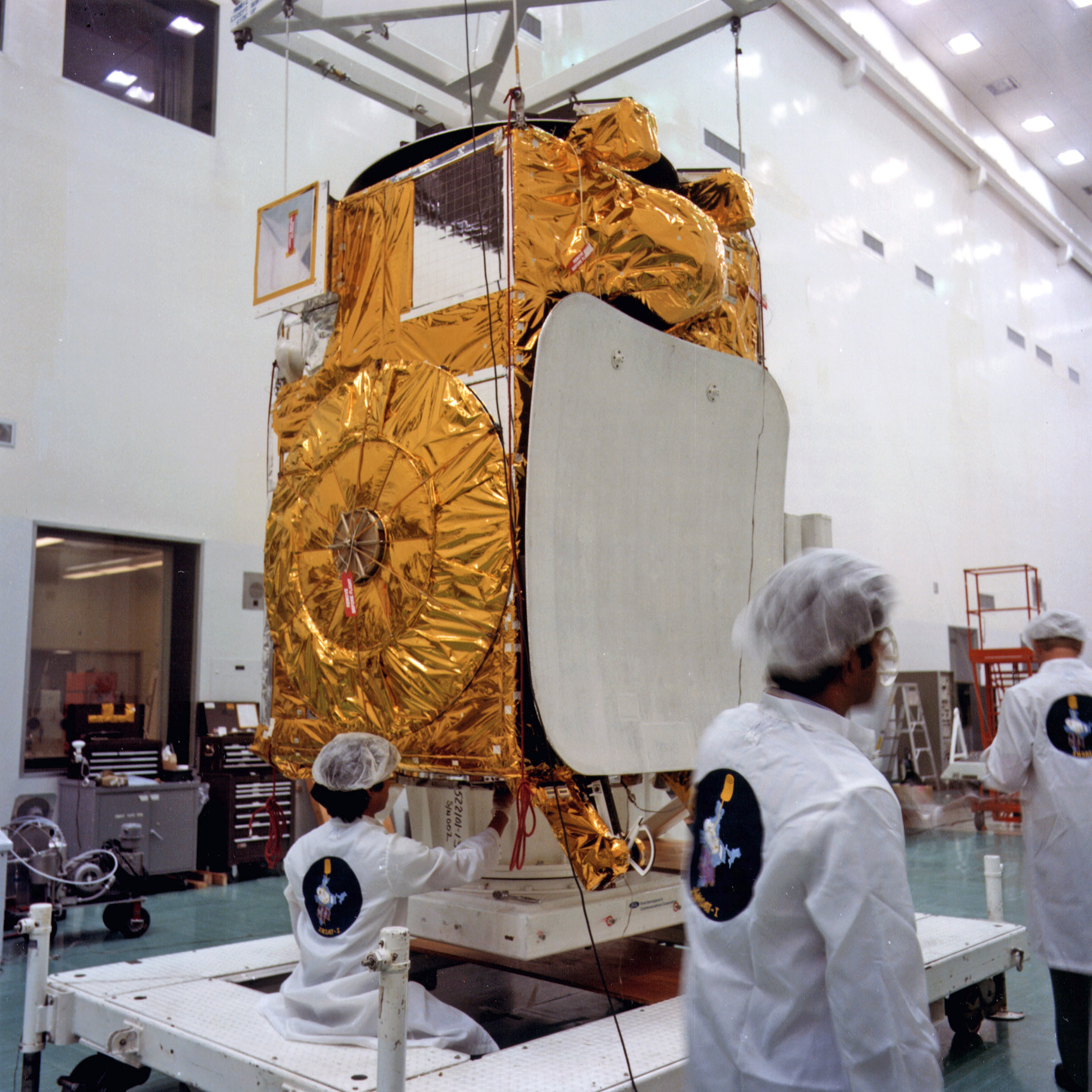
Special metals and alloys used to build satellites of ISRO are supplied by OFB, along with precision instrumentation and optoelectronics

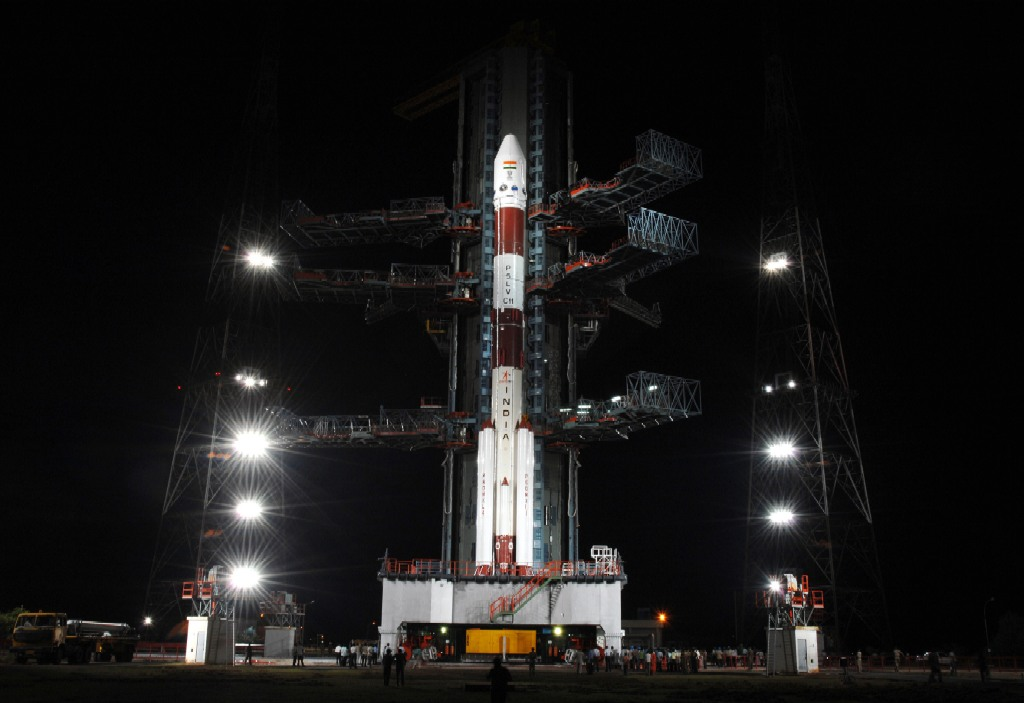
OFB supplies the propellants and explosives for PSLV to ISRO
Aerial weapons

IAF Mi-35 Hind Akbar's rockets, bombs and armaments

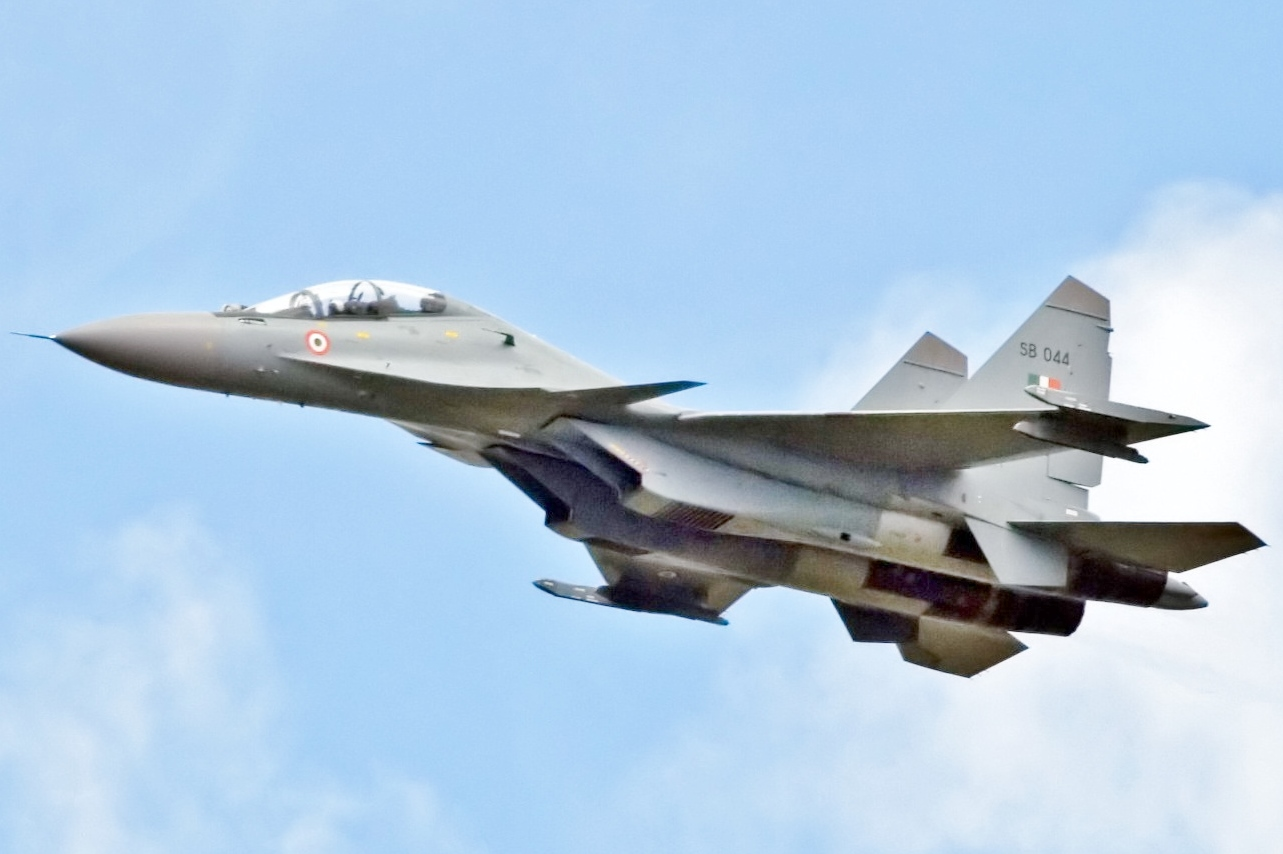
IAF Su-30MKI's rockets, bombs, missiles, armaments and parachutes

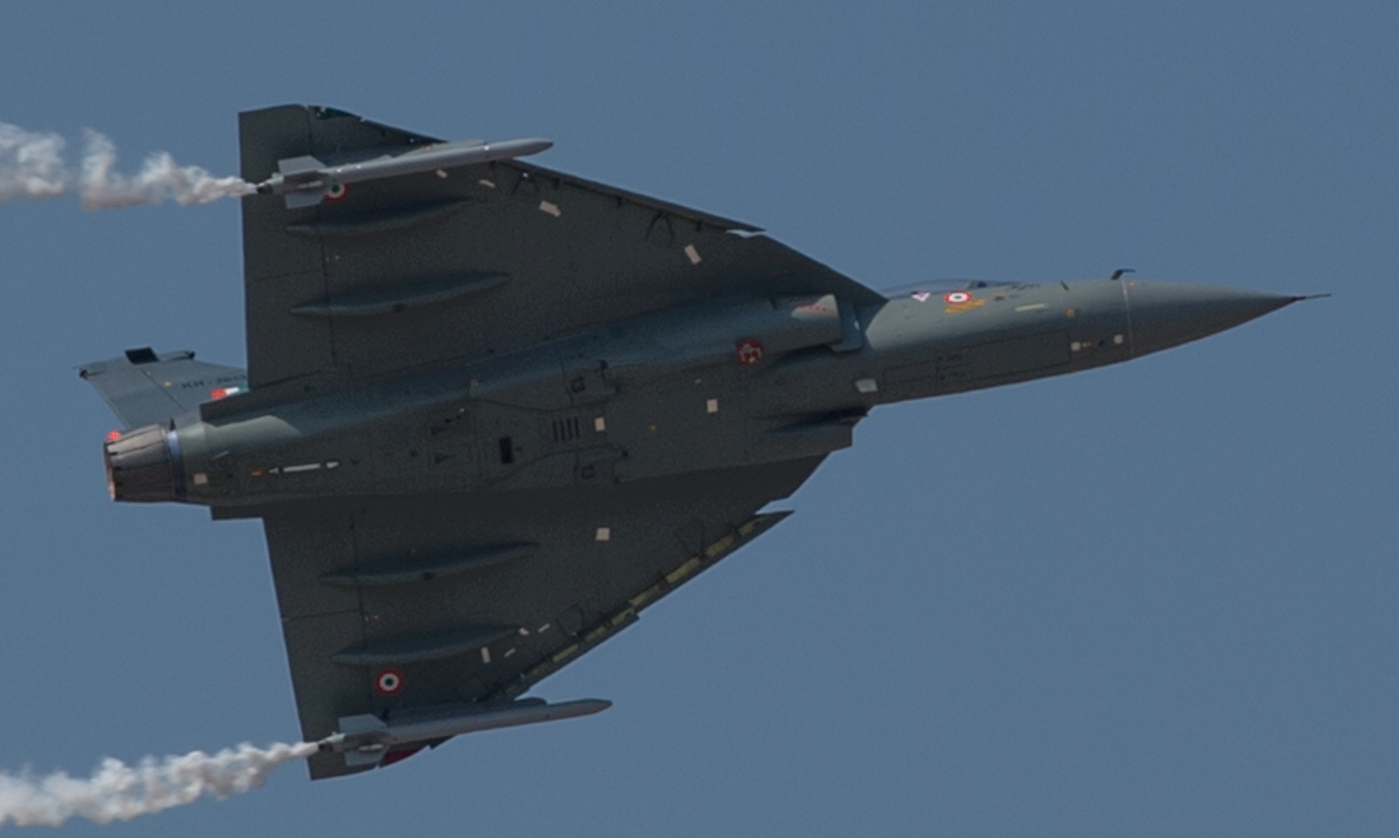
HAL Tejas uses armaments such as OFT's 23 mm GSh-23 Cannon and bombs

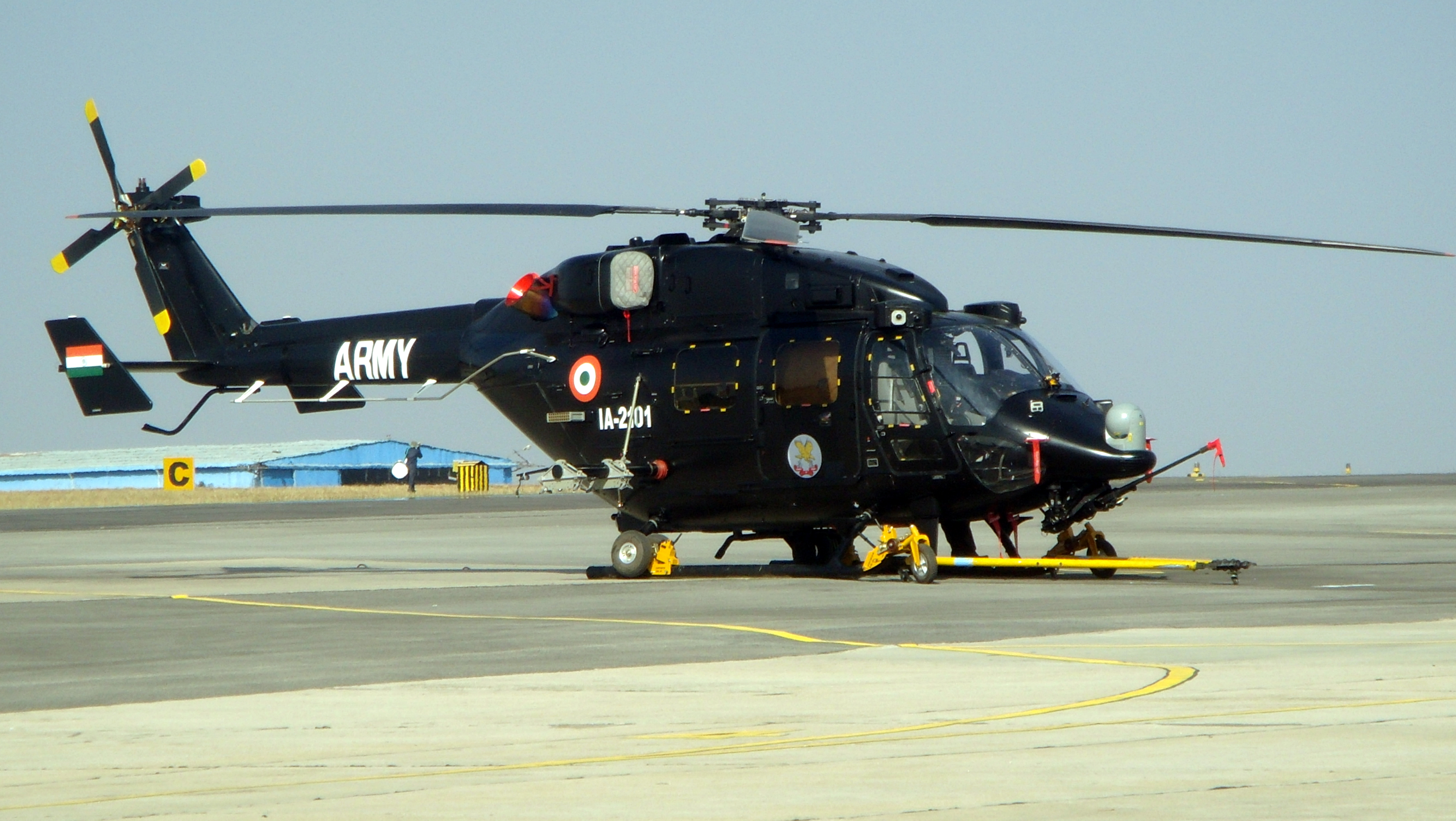
IA HAL Rudra's anti-tank, air-to-air and anti-ship missiles, rockets and torpedoes
Naval weapons

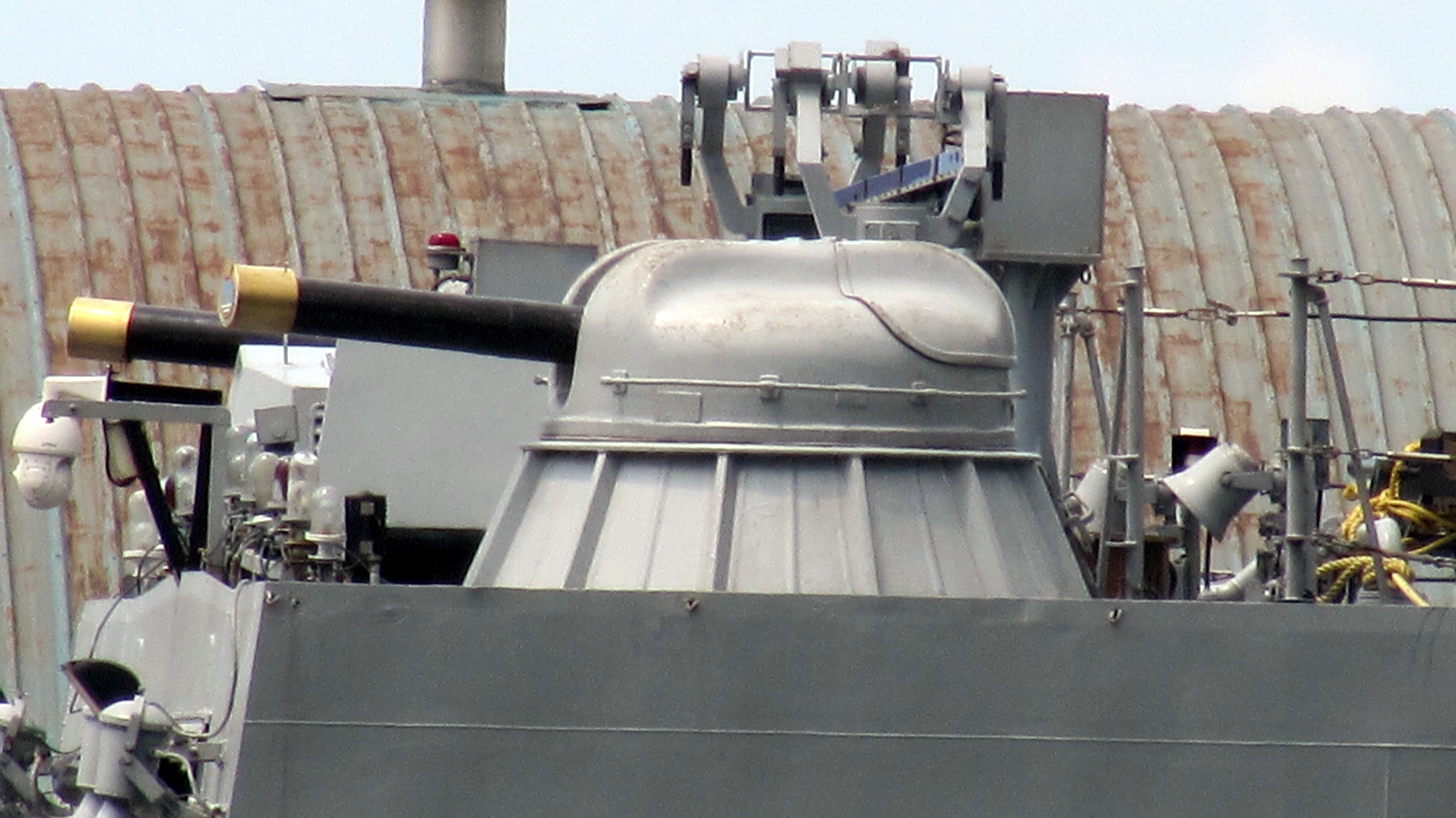
AK-630 close-in weapon system, the mainstay of most Indian naval ships is built at GSF Kolkata

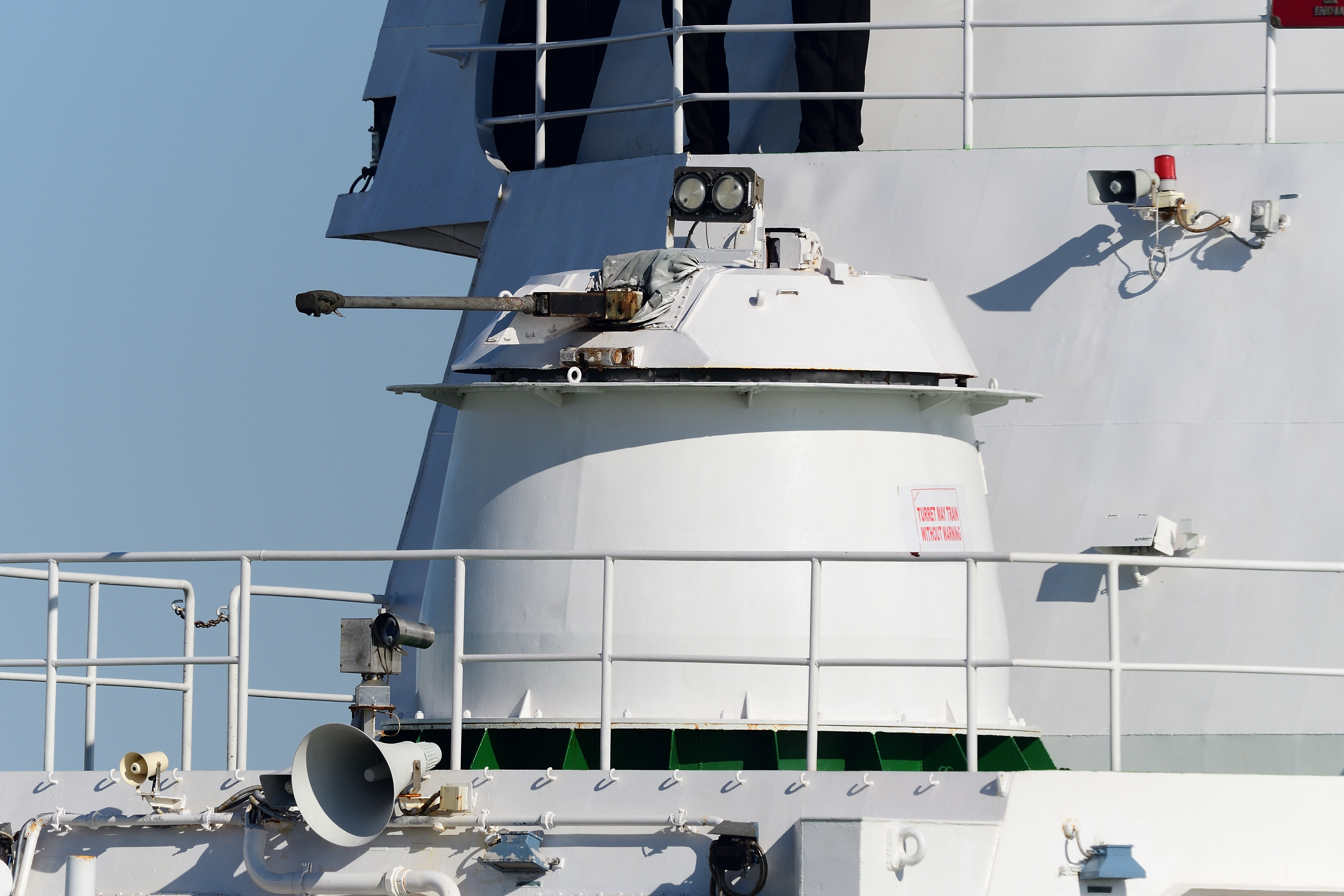
CRN-91 Naval Gun is the main armament of most Indian Coast Guard vessels is built at OFT Trichy and OFMK Hyderabad

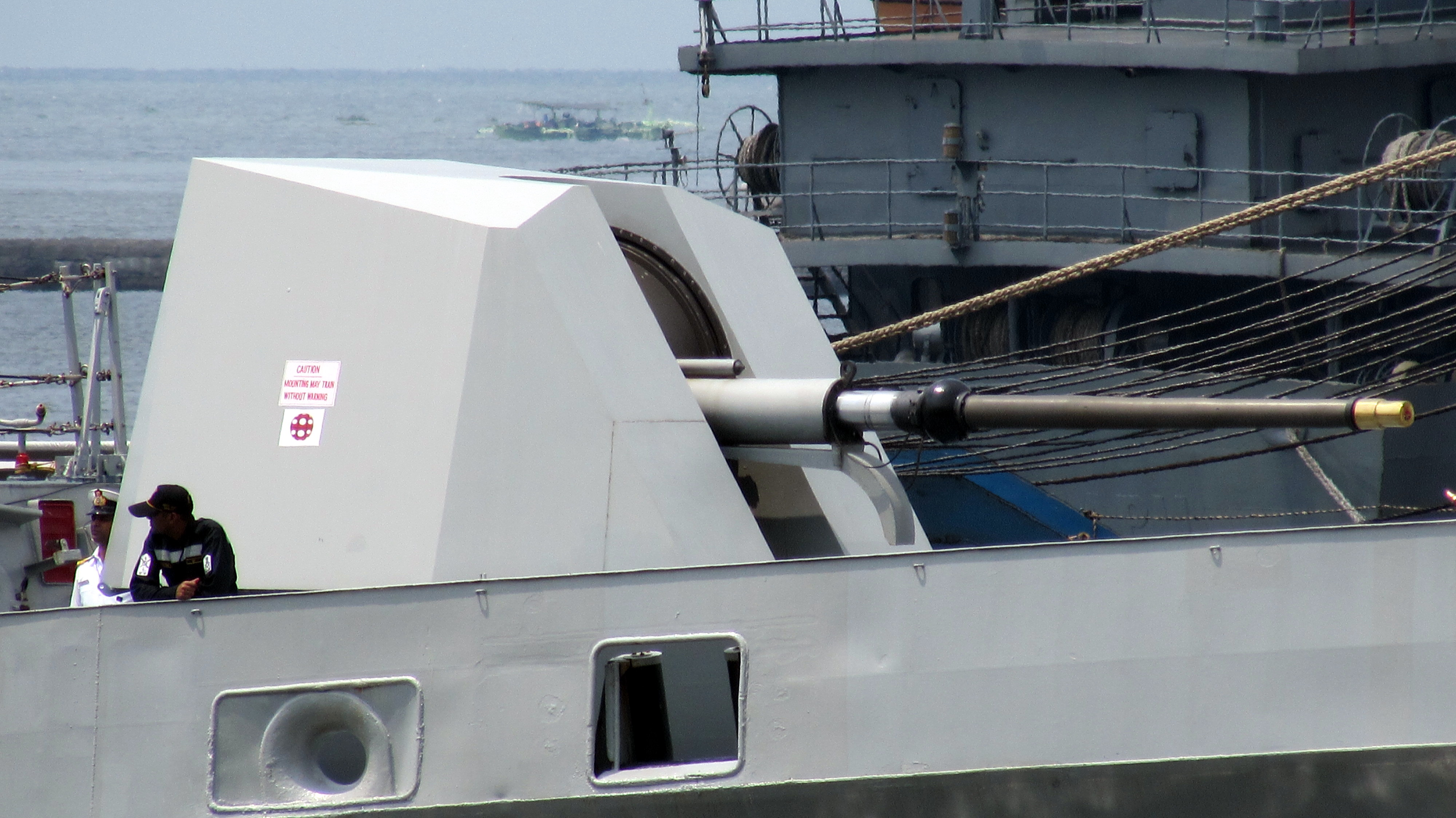
76 mm SRGM built by FGK Kanpur is on board the INS Vikrant and all the new vessels of the Indian Navy, its ammunition is manufactured at OFK Jabalpur

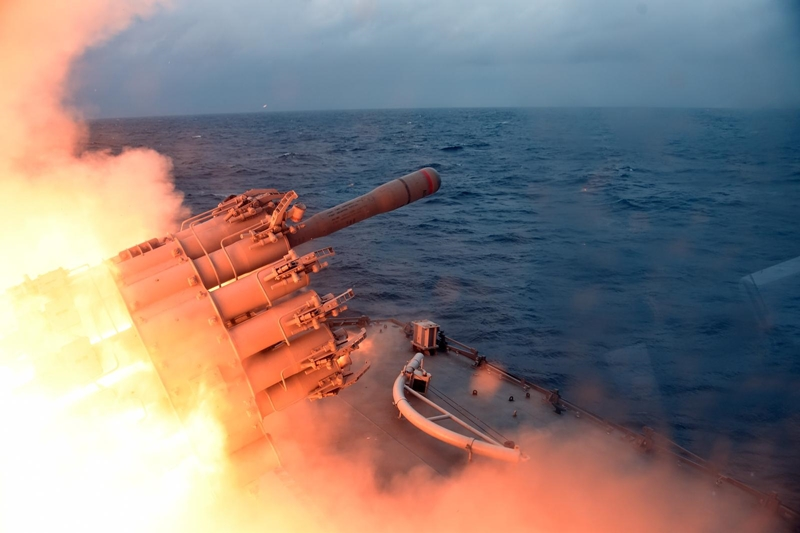
RBU-6000 anti-submarine rocket launcher and its rockets such as RGB-12 and RGB-60 are built at HAPP Trichy and AFK Pune

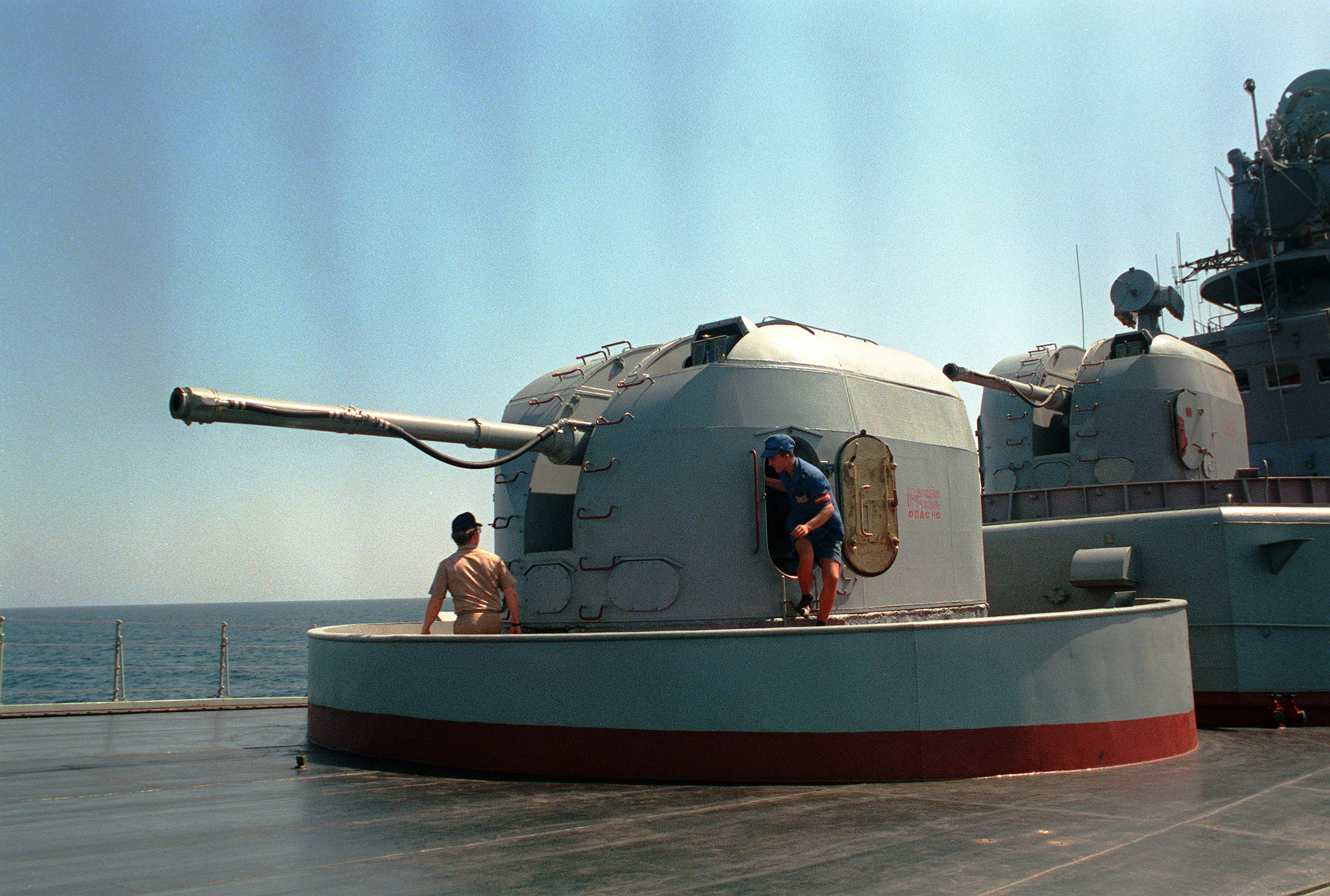
AK-100 Gun and its ammunition manufactured at GSF Kolkata

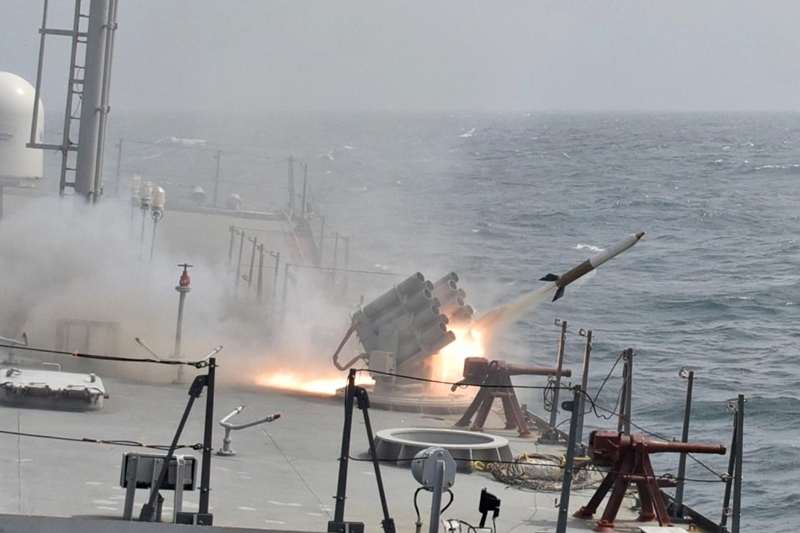
Kavach anti-missile naval decoy rockets and its launchers are built AFK Pune and MTPF Mumbai respectively

== Customers ==
=== Armed Forces ===
The prime customers of Indian Ordnance Factories were the Indian Armed Forces viz. Indian Army, Indian Navy and the Indian Air Force. Apart from supplying armaments to the Armed Forces, Ordnance Factories also meet the requirements of other customers viz. the Central Armed Police Forces, State Armed Police Forces, Paramilitary Forces of India and the Special Forces of India in respect of arms, ammunition, clothing, bullet proof vehicles, mine protected vehicles etc.

=== Civil trade ===
Customers are in the civil sector, central/state government organisations and departments such as Indian Railways, Indian Space Research Organisation, Defence Research and Development Organisation, Liquid Propulsion Systems Centre, Nuclear Fuel Complex, Aeronautical Development Agency, Department of Atomic Energy, Department of Telecommunications, and State Electricity Boards. Public Sector Undertakings in India (PSUs) such as HMT Limited, Hindustan Aeronautics Limited, Bharat Heavy Electricals Limited, Bharat Dynamics Limited, private companies and individuals etc. who purchased industrial chemicals, explosives, arms, ammunition, brass ingots, aluminium alloy products for aircraft, steel castings and forgings, vehicles, clothing and leather goods, cables and opto-electronic instruments.

=== Exports ===
Arms and ammunition, weapon spares, chemicals and explosives, parachutes, leather and clothing items were exported to more than 30 countries worldwide.

- Asia: Thailand, Malaysia, Indonesia, Sri Lanka, Bangladesh, Myanmar, Vietnam, Nepal, Singapore
- Europe: Germany, Belgium, Cyprus, Greece, Turkey, Russia, Sweden, France, Switzerland, United Kingdom
- Middle East: Oman, Egypt, Israel, Saudi Arabia, UAE
- Africa: Kenya, Botswana, Nigeria
- North and South America: United States, Canada, Brazil, Chile, Suriname

== Notable employees ==
- Narinder Singh Kapany – Former IOFS officer. Invented fibre optics that revolutionised laparoscopic and endoscopic surgery, telecommunications, power transmission, etc. Named as one of the seven "Unsung Heroes of the 20th century" by Fortune magazine for his Nobel Prize-deserving invention. Known as the "Father of Fibre Optics" and "The Man who Bent Light". Former professor at Stanford, Universities of California at Berkeley, Santa Barbara and Santa Cruz. Had more than 150 patents to his credit. Conferred upon with Padma Vibhushan, the second-highest honour in India, Pravasi Bharatiya Samman, Fellowship of the Royal Academy of Engineering (FREng). He was also offered the post of Scientific Adviser to the Defence Minister of India, by the first Prime Minister of India, Jawaharlal Nehru.
- Mantosh Sondhi - IOFS. Served as the first General Manager of the Heavy Vehicles Factory, founding Chairman & Managing Director of Bokaro Steel Plant, Member of the Atomic Energy Commission of India. First IOFS officer and first non-IAS officer to hold the posts of Secretary of Ministry of Heavy Industries, Ministry of Steel, Ministry of Mines and Ministry of Coal. Awarded Padma Shri by the President of India, Commander of the Order of the Lion of Finland by the President of Finland. The headquarters of Confederation of Indian Industry is named in his honour. He also served as the Chairman of several MNCs such as Ashok Leyland, ABB, Wärtsilä.
- Nalini Ranjan Mohanty - Former IOFS officer. Secured All India 2nd Rank in the Engineering Services Examination of 1965, served as the Chairman & Managing Director of Hindustan Aeronautics Limited, Director of Kudremukh Iron Ore Company, Mahanadi Coalfields, National Aluminium Company (NALCO), Bharat Earth Movers (BEML). Awarded Padma Shri in 2004 by the Government of India for his role in the development of LCA – Tejas.
- Brijmohan Lall Munjal - Founder of Hero MotoCorp, the world's largest two-wheeler manufacturer, and Hero Cycles, world's largest cycle manufacturer. Awarded Padma Bhushan.
- H. P. S. Ahluwalia – IOFS. First Indian to climb Mount Everest. Author, mountaineer, social worker. Founder & Chairman of Indian Spinal Injuries Centre. Conferred on with the Arjuna Award, Padma Shri and Padma Bhushan by the Government of India, Fellowship of Royal Geographical Society (FRGS). Also served as a Commissioned officer in the Indian Army and Member of Planning Commission (India).
- Santu Shahaney - IOFS. Served as the Director General Ordnance Factories (DGOF). He was awarded Padma Shri in 1962, and Padma Bhushan in 1965, by the Government of India, in the Civil Service category, for his contributions during the Indo-China War of 1962 and the Indo-Pakistani War of 1965, respectively.
- R. M. Muzumdar - IOFS. Second Indian Director General of the Indian Ordnance Factories. He was awarded the Padma Bhushan by the Government of India, in 1973, in the Civil service category, for his contributions during the Indo-Pakistani War of 1971
- Waman Dattatreya Patwardhan - IOFS officer. Developed the solid propellant for India's first space rocket launched from Thumba, and the detonation system of India's first nuclear bomb used in Operation Smiling Buddha. Served at the Ammunition Factory Khadki, and as the first Director of High Energy Materials Research Laboratory (HEMRL) and the Armaments Research and Development Establishment (ARDE) of the Defence Research and Development Organisation (DRDO). Awarded Padma Shri in 1974.
- H. G. S. Murthy - IOFS. Known as one of the "Seven Pioneers of the Indian Space Programme". He served at the Machine Tool Prototype Factory (MTPF), Ambernath, and as the first Director of the Thumba Equatorial Rocket Launching Station (TERLS), and the Space Science & Technology Centre, now known as the Vikram Sarabhai Space Centre, of the Indian Space Research Organisation (ISRO). Awarded Padma Shri in 1969.
- K. C. Banerjee - IOFS. Received Padma Shri in 1967, for his contributions during the Indo-Pakistani War of 1965, as the General Manager of Rifle Factory Ishapore, that developed and manufactured the 7.62 Self-Loading Automatic Rifle, that played decisive role in India's victory in the Indo-Pakistani War of 1965.
- O. P. Bahl, an IOFS officer. Received Padma Shri in 1972, in the civil-service category, as the General Manager of Ammunition Factory, Khadki, which developed and manufactured the anti-submarine rockets used in sinking the submarine PNS Ghazi during the Indo-Pakistani War of 1971.

== See also ==
- Defence industry of India
- Defence Research and Development Organisation
- Indian Ordnance Factories Service
- Public Sector Undertakings in India
- Ministry of Defence
- Cantonment board
- Indian Defence Estates Service
- List of equipment of the Indian Army
