= Ministry of Defence (India) =

Government ministry responsible for national defence in India

- Government of India

- Ministry of Defence

Ministry overview
- Formed: 15 August 1947; 79 years ago
- Preceding Ministry: Department of Defence (1938–1947)
- Jurisdiction: Government of India
- Headquarters: South Block, Secretariat Building, New Delhi, India; 28°36′50″N 77°12′32″E
- Annual budget: ₹7.85 lakh crore (US$82 billion) (2026–27)
- Minister responsible: Rajnath Singh, Minister of Defence
- Deputy Minister responsible: Sanjay Seth, Minister of State for Defence
- Child agencies: Department of Defence; Department of Military Affairs; Department of Defence Production; Department of Defence Research and Development; Department of Ex-servicemen Welfare
- Website: mod.gov.in

The Ministry of Defence (MoD; Rakṣā Mantrālaya) is a ministry of the Government of India responsible for matters relating to the defence of India and the Indian Armed Forces. The ministry provides the policy framework and resources required by the armed forces to discharge their responsibilities for the defence of the country.

The President of India is the supreme commander of the Indian Armed Forces. The ministry exercises administrative and policy oversight over the Indian Army, Indian Navy and Indian Air Force, while the Indian Coast Guard also functions under the Ministry of Defence.

The ministry is headed politically by the Minister of Defence. As of August 2026, Rajnath Singh is the Defence Minister and Sanjay Seth is the Minister of State for Defence.

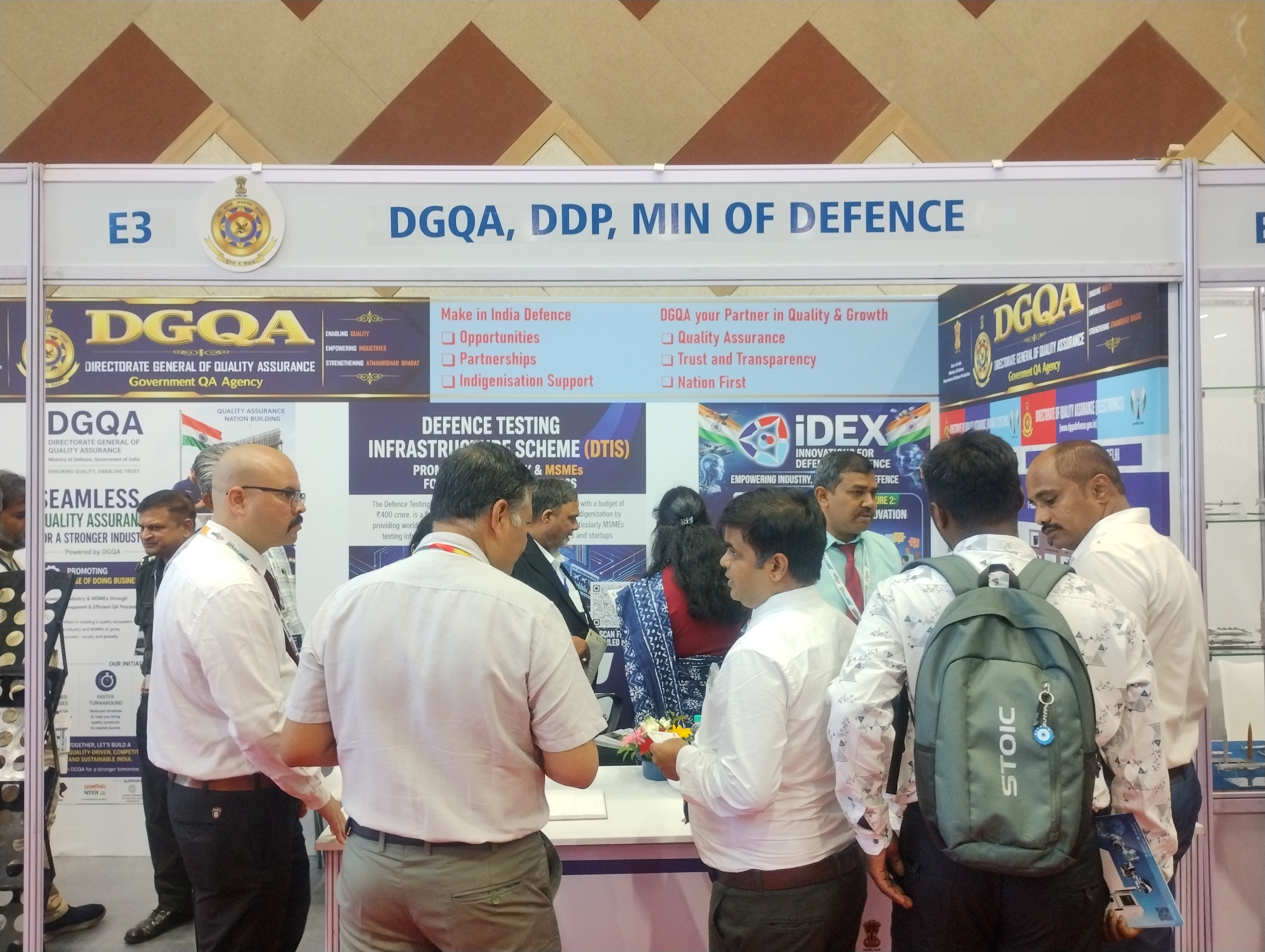
Ministry of Defence at DEF-TECH Bharat 2026, KTPO, Bengaluru

== History ==
A Military Department was created in the government of the East India Company at Calcutta in 1776 to process and record orders relating to military affairs.

Following administrative reorganisations during British rule, the Army Department was redesignated as the Defence Department in January 1938. After the independence of India, the Department of Defence became the Ministry of Defence under a cabinet minister in August 1947.

Following the Sino-Indian War of 1962, the government created the Department of Defence Production to strengthen domestic production of military equipment. A Department of Defence Supplies followed in 1965; the two were later merged. The Department of Defence Research and Development was subsequently established as a separate department.

The Department of Ex-servicemen Welfare was created to deal with the welfare, resettlement and pensionary matters of former service personnel.

=== Higher defence reforms ===
Following the Kargil War, reforms were undertaken to improve joint planning and coordination among the three services. The Integrated Defence Staff was established in 2001 as part of the resulting restructuring of India's higher defence organisation.

A major further reform occurred in December 2019 when the Union Cabinet approved creation of the post of Chief of Defence Staff (CDS) and the establishment of the Department of Military Affairs (DMA).

The CDS serves concurrently as Secretary of the Department of Military Affairs. The DMA was established to promote jointness in procurement, training and staffing of the armed forces, facilitate greater integration of military commands and promote the use of indigenous military equipment.

== Organisation ==
The Ministry of Defence comprises five principal departments:

- Department of Defence (DoD)
- Department of Military Affairs (DMA)
- Department of Defence Production (DDP)
- Department of Defence Research and Development (DDR&D)
- Department of Ex-servicemen Welfare (DESW)

=== Department of Defence ===
The Department of Defence is headed by the Defence Secretary. It deals with defence policy, preparation for the defence of India, capital acquisitions, international defence cooperation, parliamentary matters and various defence establishments.

As of August 2026, Rajesh Kumar Singh serves as Defence Secretary.

=== Department of Military Affairs ===
The Department of Military Affairs is headed by the Chief of Defence Staff, who serves as Secretary to the Government of India for the department.

Its allocated responsibilities include the Indian Army, Indian Navy and Indian Air Force; the Territorial Army; the Integrated Headquarters of the Ministry of Defence; military works; and service-specific procurement other than capital acquisitions.

The department is also responsible for promoting jointness among the armed forces and facilitating restructuring intended to increase integration between the services.

=== Department of Defence Production ===
The Department of Defence Production (DDP) is responsible for policies concerning defence manufacturing, indigenisation and the administration of Defence Public Sector Undertakings.

As of 2026, the department administers 16 Defence Public Sector Undertakings, including seven companies formed following the corporatisation of the former Ordnance Factory Board.

The 16 Defence Public Sector Undertakings are:

- Hindustan Aeronautics Limited
- Hindustan Shipyard Limited
- Bharat Electronics
- Bharat Dynamics Limited
- BEML Limited
- Mazagon Dock Shipbuilders
- Garden Reach Shipbuilders & Engineers
- Goa Shipyard
- Mishra Dhatu Nigam
- Munitions India
- Armoured Vehicles Nigam
- Advanced Weapons and Equipment India
- Troop Comforts Limited
- Gliders India
- India Optel
- Yantra India

The department also administers programmes intended to increase the participation of private companies, start-ups and MSMEs in defence manufacturing. These include the SRIJAN indigenisation portal and Innovations for Defence Excellence (iDEX).

=== Department of Defence Research and Development ===
The Department of Defence Research and Development oversees the Defence Research and Development Organisation (DRDO).

As of August 2026, Defence Secretary Rajesh Kumar Singh is additionally holding charge as Secretary, Department of Defence Research and Development and Chairman, DRDO.

DRDO is responsible for the research and development of military technologies and systems for the armed forces.

=== Department of Ex-Servicemen Welfare ===
The Department of Ex-Servicemen Welfare deals with pension, welfare and resettlement policies concerning former members of the armed forces.

Its organisations include the Directorate General Resettlement, Kendriya Sainik Board and the Ex-Servicemen Contributory Health Scheme.

=== Defence Finance ===
Defence Finance provides financial advice and oversight in matters involving defence expenditure.

As of August 2026, Vishvajit Sahay of the Indian Defence Accounts Service serves as Secretary (Defence Finance).

The Controller General of Defence Accounts operates the defence accounts system and provides payment, accounting and internal-audit services to the Ministry and armed forces.

=== History Division ===
The History Division was established on 26 October 1953 to undertake the compilation of the histories of post independence military operations conducted by the Indian Armed Forces. It functions as the research, record and reference office of the Ministry of Defence and the Indian Armed Forces. It receives records from the Ministry of Defence and three Services HQs on a regular basis for preservation and use. The Division has published 20 volumes so far. The Division also runs a Fellowship scheme to encourage research in military history. The History Division works under Joint Secretary (Medical & History) in the Ministry of Defence.

== Armed Forces and joint organisations ==
Services under the Ministry of Defence

Indian Army

Indian Navy

Indian Air Force

Indian Coast Guard

=== Chief of Defence Staff ===
The Chief of Defence Staff is the principal military adviser to the Defence Minister on tri-service matters and serves as the Permanent Chairman of the Chiefs of Staff Committee.

General N. S. Raja Subramani assumed office as the third Chief of Defence Staff and Secretary, Department of Military Affairs on 31 May 2026.

=== Integrated Defence Staff ===
The Integrated Defence Staff (IDS) provides tri-service staff support and assists with joint planning, doctrine, capability development and integration among the Army, Navy and Air Force.

The headquarters is led by the Chief of Integrated Defence Staff to the Chairman Chiefs of Staff Committee (CISC).

Air Marshal Tejinder Singh assumed the appointment of CISC on 1 July 2026.

== Current military leadership ==
As of August 2026, the senior military leadership is:

Officer	Appointment
General N. S. Raja Subramani	Chief of Defence Staff and Secretary, Department of Military Affairs
General Dhiraj Seth	Chief of the Army Staff
Admiral Krishna Swaminathan	Chief of the Naval Staff
Air Chief Marshal Amar Preet Singh	Chief of the Air Staff

=== Vice Chiefs ===
Officer	Appointment
Lieutenant General Sandeep Jain	Vice Chief of the Army Staff
Vice Admiral Ajay Kochhar	Vice Chief of the Naval Staff
Air Marshal Ashutosh Dixit	Vice Chief of the Air Staff

== Defence budget ==
For the 2026–27 financial year, the Union Government allocated ₹7.85 lakh crore to the Ministry of Defence, the highest allocation among Union ministries. It represented an increase of 15.19 per cent over the 2025–26 Budget Estimate and accounted for 14.67 per cent of total central-government expenditure.

The allocation was distributed among capital expenditure, operational and maintenance expenditure, pay and allowances, pensions and civil organisations.

Of the total allocation, more than ₹2.19 lakh crore was provided under the capital head of the Defence Forces, an increase of 21.84 per cent from the 2025–26 Budget Estimate. Approximately ₹1.85 lakh crore of this amount was earmarked for capital acquisition.

The 2026–27 allocation for DRDO was ₹29,100.25 crore, while ₹12,100 crore was allocated to the Ex-Servicemen Contributory Health Scheme.

== Defence offices ==
The Ministry's senior offices continue to operate from South Block in New Delhi.

In September 2021, two new Defence Offices Complexes were inaugurated at Kasturba Gandhi Marg and Africa Avenue in New Delhi. The complexes were designed to accommodate approximately 7,000 Ministry of Defence and service personnel who had previously worked from dispersed offices and temporary hutments.

== Defence production and indigenisation ==
The Ministry has pursued policies intended to increase domestic production of defence equipment.

The SRIJAN portal maintained by the Department of Defence Production identifies previously imported equipment and components for potential domestic development and manufacture.

The Innovations for Defence Excellence programme supports start-ups, MSMEs and individual innovators developing technologies for defence and aerospace applications.

The conversion of the former Ordnance Factory Board's 41 production establishments into seven new Defence Public Sector Undertakings took effect in 2021. These seven companies form part of the 16 DPSUs currently administered by the Department of Defence Production.

== Inter-service organisations ==
Organisations under or associated with the Ministry's joint defence structure include:

- Integrated Defence Staff
- Defence Intelligence Agency
- Defence Space Agency
- Defence Cyber Agency
- Strategic Forces Command
- Andaman and Nicobar Command
- National Defence Academy
- Defence Services Staff College
- National Defence College
- College of Defence Management
- Armed Forces Medical Services
- National Cadet Corps
- Border Roads Organisation
- Directorate General of Defence Estates
- Controller General of Defence Accounts

== See also ==
- Minister of Defence (India)
- Indian Armed Forces
- Chief of Defence Staff (India)
- Department of Military Affairs
- Defence Research and Development Organisation
- Military budget of India
- Defence industry of India
- List of defence ministers of India
