= High Speed Low Drag Bomb =

- Type: Precision-guided general-purpose bomb
- Place of origin: India

Service history
- Used by: Indian Air Force

Production history
- Designer: Armament Research and Development Establishment; Research Centre Imarat
- Designed: 2013–present
- Manufacturer: Munitions India; Adani Defence & Aerospace
- No. built: 800+

Specifications
- Mass: 250 kg (550 lb); 450 kg (990 lb); 500 kg (1,100 lb); (additional RTU/BTU: ± 25 kg)
- Length: 2.37 m (93.31 in) (HSLD-250); 2.80 m (110.24 in) (HSLD-450); 3.13 m (123.23 in) (PGHSLD-500); 3.03 m (119.29 in) (500 kg GP Bomb)
- Warhead: Dentex (HSLD-250, HSLD-450); Torpex 4B + RDX (500 kg GP Bomb)
- Warhead weight: 103 kg ± 3 kg (HSLD-250); 200 kg ± 5 kg (HSLD-450); 185 kg ± 3 kg (500 kg GP Bomb)
- Detonation mechanism: Time fuze with electric/mechanical delay
- Operational range: PGHSLD: 30 km from 10 km altitude; 21 km from 5 km altitude; 13.5 km from 2 km altitude; TARA: 150-180 km from 5 km altitude
- Flight altitude: 10 km to 150 m
- Guidance system: Mid-course: FOG-INS + multi-GNSS (PGHSLD & TARA) Terminal: PGHSLD: SAL (optional); TARA: EO/IIR homing
- Accuracy: PGHSLD: 3 m CEP with SAL; 30 m CEP without SAL; TARA: <3 m CEP with UC-IIR; <20 m CEP with SAT
- Launch platform: Dassault Mirage 2000; SEPECAT Jaguar; Sukhoi Su-30MKI; HAL Tejas
- References: HSLD, PGHSLD

The High Speed Low Drag (HSLD) is a family of short-range air-dropped general-purpose bomb developed by the Defence Research and Development Organisation for the Indian Air Force. It can be used against the destruction of strategic high value enemy infrastructure from stand-off distances. The HSLD is comparable to the Mark 80 series bombs used by the United States Air Force and its allies.

Multiple guidance kits, like PGHSLD and TARA REK, are also under development to convert these unguided bombs into precision-guided munitions. The guidance kit will use semi-active laser or electro-optical/imaging infrared seekers to assist in precision strikes.

== Description ==
The Armament Research and Development Establishment is India's primary agency that started developing HSLD with the help from other DRDO laboratories to upgrade the conventional free fall unguided ordnance used by the IAF fighter pilots while Ordnance Factory Board is the lead production agency. The development started with the aim to replace the older generation imported general purpose bombs that impose huge drag loss on fighter aircraft used by the IAF. The HSLD bomb is specially designed to productively use the higher speed of up to Mach 1.1 and wider flight envelope of newer generation NATO and Russian origin as well as Indian made aircraft.

High Energy Materials Research Laboratory developed the conventional type warhead for the HSLD and GP bombs that features blast, fragmentation and shaped charge for bunker buster role. By feeding the target coordinates, the warhead can be used to effectively destroy runway, railway track, bridge, industrial facility, dock and bunker while able to work in the absence of GNSS input due to satellite jamming.

HSLD can be launched from variety of aircraft that are under IAF inventory like Dassault Mirage 2000, SEPECAT Jaguar, Sukhoi Su-30MKI and HAL Tejas.

=== 250 kg and 450 kg HSLD ===
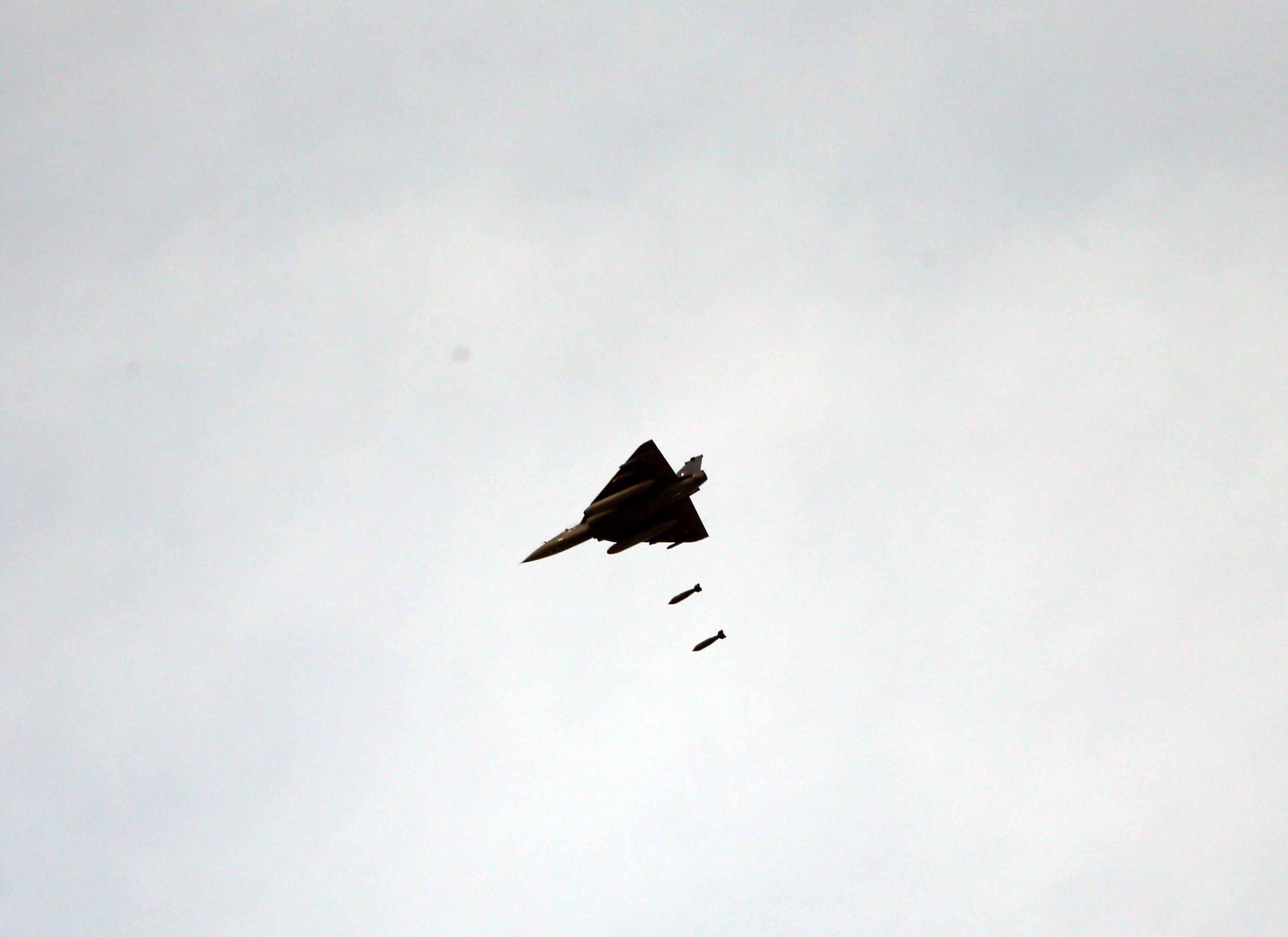
HAL Tejas releasing HSLD during Exercise Vayu Shakti 2019.

Each HSLD bomb variant has two types of tail unit — retarder tail unit (RTU) (for low-level bombing missions) and ballistic tail unit (BTU) (for strategic high level bombing). The 250 kg and 450 kg HSLD bomb uses Dentex as their primary explosive.

On 29 July 2023, Ordnance Factory Muradnagar of Yantra India flagged off the first batch of 780 bomb casings of HSLD-450.

=== PGHSLD-500 ===
The Precision Guidance Kit for 450 kg HSLD Bomb, designated PGHSLD-500, has a mass of 520 ± 10 kg (1,146 ± 22 lb) and a length of 3.1 metre. The 450 kg HSLD has a high-explosive fragmented warhead with AVU-ETM fuse. The PGK consists of two sub-units — Nose Extension Unit (NEXU) and Smart Tail Unit (STU). The NEXU includes fixed canards as flight control surfaces, semi-active laser (SAL) seeker, anti-jamming GPS antenna, two-axis gimballed laser with a range of 4 km and 20° field of view. The STU includes actuation system with four individually controlled fins, fibre-optic gyro-based INS module, GPS antenna, electrically initiated thermal battery, a flight control unit (FCU) and a telemetry module. When paired with the guidance kit, the bomb can achieve an accuracy of 30 m CEP with INS/GPS mid-course guidance and that of 3 m CEP with SAL seeker as terminal guidance. The bomb is compatible with Su-30MKI and HAL Tejas.

=== 500 kg General Purpose (GP) Bomb ===
The 500 kg GP Bomb carries 10,300 preformed fragmented steel shells of 15 mm diameter. Each shell can target an area of up to 50 m from place of detonation with fragment density of >1 hit/sq m. The bomb is compatible with Russian and SEPECAT Jaguar fighter aircraft. The bomb has both impact and impact delay modes of explosion and utilises Torpex-4B mixed with RDX that act as explosive booster.

The Ministry of Defence gave the green light to start mass production of 500 kg GP Bomb by Munitions India at Ordnance Factory Khamaria. On 10 January 2022, under the guidance of a team from HEMRL and ARDE, the first two 500-kg GP bomb were carefully filled with primary and secondary warhead fillings in the F-6 section of the factory. The first batch of 48 such bombs was delivered to the Indian Air Force on 3 April 2022.

== Related developments ==
=== HSLD Mk 2 ===
The HSLD Mk 2 is reportedly an improved variant of the earlier versions with a range of 180 km (110 mi) when launched from an altitude of 16,000 ft (4.9 km). However, multiple reports also refer to HSLD Mk 2 as the Indian designation for the Israeli-origin Rampage missile.

On 7 August 2024, IAF issued a request for proposal was floated by the Ministry of Defence for the upgrade of 24 MiG-29s, to integrate HSLD Mk 2 bombs. These upgrade will include addition of additional hardware (bomb racks on external hardpoints) as well as necessary software on to the aircraft. The project shall be overseen by 11 Base Repair Depot of the IAF. Subsequently, the entire fleet will be equipped with this in phases. HSLD Mk 2 is integrated and deployed on Su-30MKI and SEPECAT Jaguar fleet. The IAF has sought MoD for manufacturing HSLD Mk 2 in India.

In May 2025, it was reported that IAF plans to modify 112 Jaguar aircraft in order to equip them with HSLD Mk 2 bombs. This will follow the modifications of one fighter and trainer each of the DARIN II and III upgrades by Hindustan Aeronautics Limited and Aircraft and Systems Testing Establishment.

=== Tactical Advanced Range Augmentation (TARA) ===
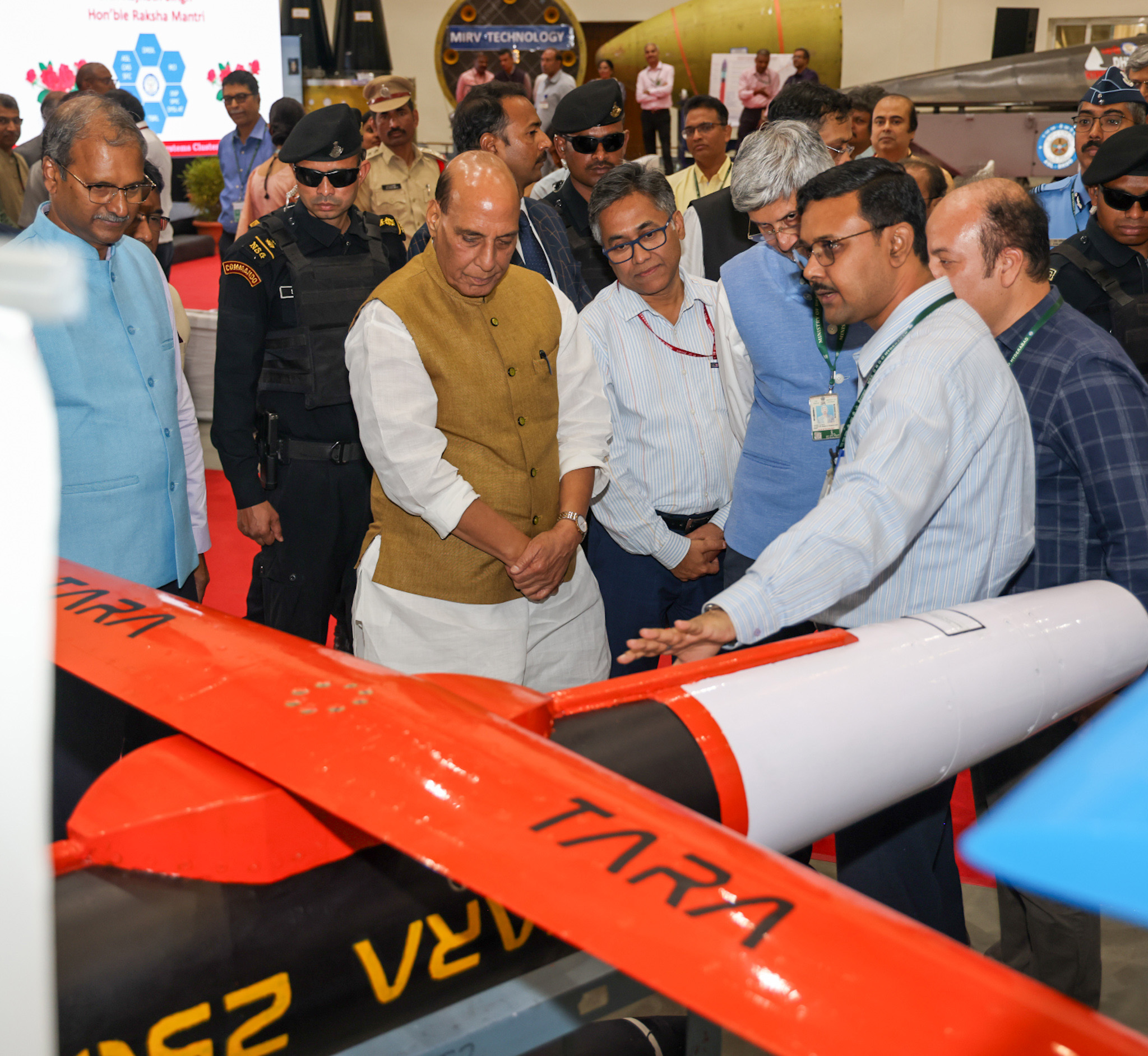
The TARA-250 system being shown to Defence Minister Rajnath Singh

The Tactical Advanced Range Augmentation (TARA) Range Extension Kit (REK) is a guidance kit that converts the HSLD, and GP series of unguided bombs into standoff, precision-guided munitions. The REK kit uses a singe deployable wing and a four-fin tail unit to glide for a longer distance before hitting its target. There will be 3 variants of REK kit — 250 kg (HSLD-250), 450 kg (HSLD-450) and 500 kg (500 kg GP Bomb). The Research Centre Imarat (RCI) is the nodal agency for the project as a Development cum Production Partner (DcPP) programme with the Adani Defence & Aerospace.

The TARA REK will incorporate electro-optical and imaging infrared guidance for enhanced precision. The expected range of the bomb is 150-180 km when launched at 5 km altitude and a speed of Mach 0.8. The CEP of the kit should be <5 m.

According to the Janes Information Services, the released can be at altitudes ranging from 10,000–45,000 ft (3,000–13,700 m) at speeds aproacing Mach 0.8. Further, when released at an altitude of 42,000 ft (13,000 m) with a speed of Mach 0.9, a maximum range of 80–100 km (50–62 mi) can be achieved. The kits offer two accuracy variants — Satellite Aided Terminal (SAT) for a CEP of less than 20 m and Uncooled Imaging Infrared (UC-IIR) for a CEP of less than 3 m. The specifications was displayed when the 500 kg variant was displayed at the Aero India 2025 by the Adani Defence & Aerospace.

In 2023, the Indian Air Force and Indian Navy carried out Ground Fitment Trials (GFT) by integrating TARA with Jaguar Darin II and MiG-29K, respectively. In March 2024, the first REK-equipped HSLD 250 was showcased in March 2024. The HAL Tejas can be equipped with the guided bombs. In May 2026, the first successful air-launched test of the 500 kg variant was conducted after the production of the TARA kit commenced.

=== 1,000 kg Aerial Bomb ===
The 1,000 kg Aerial Bomb is classified as a "natural fragmentation, high-calibre munition capable of generating high blast effect and significant peak over-pressure (PoP) against enemy targets”.

On 5 April 2026, report indicated that the Ministry of defence as issued an expression of interest (EoI) to design, develop and procure Mark 84 class 1,000 kg Ariel bomb along with tail units and associated equipment for the Indian Air Force. The project will be undertaken in two phases. The first phase will include the design and development of six prototypes of aerial bombs (live and inert), its tail wing and associated equipment. The second phase will be the procurement phase where are commercial request for proposal (RfP) will be sent to the qualifying development agencies. Around 600 units are expected to be procured. The system must be compatible with both Russian and Western origin aircraft. The project will be undertaken under the 'Make-II' (industry-funded) sub-category of Defence Acquisition Procedure (DAP) 2020, followed by procurement under the 'Buy (Indian–IDDM)' category which stands for Indigenously Designed, Developed and Manufactured.

The first phase of the project will be undertaken by the selected development agencies, and includes single-stage composite trials (SSCT), following which preliminary staff qualitative requirements (PSQRs) will be converted into air staff qualitative requirements (ASQRs). A minimum indigenous content of 50% is expected in the development phase. The timeline of the project from issuing EoI to contract signing is 2.5 years. This includes prototype development, user trials, evaluation, commercial processes and contract finalisation.

=== Indigenous Precision Range Extension Kit (IPREK) ===
The Apollo Micro Systems announced on 28 July 2026 that they have been selected by the IAF as the prime development agency for the IPREK programme which aims to develop bolt-on precision guidance and range extension kit that converts 500 kg GP bombs into precision-guided munitions. The programme will be carried out under the Defence Acquisition Procedure 2020 (DAP-2020) Make-II (Industry Funded) Prototype Sanction Order (PSO). A maximum range of 80–100 km (50–62 mi) is expected with an accuracy of within 3 metres (9.8 ft). The initial procurement phase would include the delivery of over 500 units. IPREK will incorporate DSMAC to function in GNSS-denied conditions and NavIC with EO and IIR terminal guidance for day-and-night operation. The guidance, navigation, and control software, flight computer, and integration architecture will all be entirely owned by the company.

=== PGB-500 ===
The PGB-500 is a specialized 500-kg smart bomb that was built from the ground up in accordance with ARDE specifications. It is big enough to demolish critical enemy infrastructure, command centers, and reinforced military bunkers. Munitions India produces the 500 kg Precision Guided Bomb as part of the PGB-500 Project. In 2024, Ordnance Factory Khamaria (OFK) successfully produced two inert PGBs for testing. ARDE designed the underlying technology, and OFK has received a total of 24 shells for ammunition development. By 2024, Su-30MKI had successfully tested the inert PGB-500 at the Pokhran test range, precisely striking its target. The PGB-500 can carry a wide range of warheads and, even with poor visibility, can destroy its target from a long distance using GNSS/INS with terminal homing options. A single unit is expected to cost approximately ₹3 crore (equivalent to ₹3.2 crore or US$330,000 in 2026).

During September and October 2026, the Indian Air Force is expected to conduct the carriage and release trials of PGB-500. The trials will be conducted from Jodhpur Air Force Station and at Chandan Field Firing Range in Pokhran, Jaisalmer. Release trials are anticipated to assess safe separation, trajectory stability, and guidance accuracy of active units after carriage trials confirm integration, aerodynamic stability, and release precision.

== Trials ==
Two successful developmental trials were conducted in 2013 to prove the capability of the munition with all development related works to be completed by 2014.

During the same time, the Precision Guidance Kit for 450 Kg HSLD Bomb, designated PGHSLD-500, underwent carriage as well as carriage and release trials (CRTs) in the Pokhran Test Range. Two weapons were employed — one equipped with sensors, telemetry, and a data logger for carriage trials, and the other fitted with GPS and telemetry for Captive Release Trials (CRT). Two captive sorties with the weapon were conducted for carriage trials. The PGHSLD-500, mounted on station 05/06, was cleared for the full flight envelope. The weapon was released from an altitude of 5 km (16,000 ft) and at an airspeed of 900 km/h (Mach 0.73). The trials were completed successfully. The trials were carried out by a Su-30MKI aircraft from No. 31 Squadron, 32 Wing, Jodhpur Air Force Station (AFS).

In May–June 2017, the ARDE conducted successful trials of the 500 kg GP Bomb from Jodhpur AFS. The tests covered ground adaptation, carriage and handling, limited separation, and release from a Su-30MKI aircraft. Carriage trials reached the upper limit of Mach 0.85 Mach at 150 m altitude, with 6.5 g and full-roll manoeuvres. The bomb maintained structural integrity and was safely released from station 7. Upon impact, the live bomb functioned effectively, validating the complete explosive train and proving operational readiness. The trials were conducted with the help of Aircraft and Systems Testing Establishment, Hindustan Aeronautics Limited and Office of the Regional Director Aeronautical Quality Assurance among others.

As of April 2025, TARA is undergoing trials with SEPECAT Jaguar aircraft of the Indian Air Force. The first flight trial was conducted on 7 May 2026 off the coast of Odisha over the Integrated Test Range (ITR) by dropping a 500 kg bomb equipped with TARA kit from a Jaguar aircraft.

== Variants ==
- High Speed Low Drag Bomb – 250 kg and 450 kg
- General Purpose Bomb – 500 kg
- Precision Guided Bomb (PGHSLD) – 500 kg (HSLD-450)
- Tactical Advanced Range Augmentation (TARA) – 250 kg, 450 kg and 500 kg

== Operators ==
India

- Indian Air Force

== See also ==
- Sudarshan laser-guided bomb
- Gaurav (glide bomb)
- Smart Anti-Airfield Weapon

Other nations

Mark 80 series - American equivalent
