= Pinaka multi-barrel rocket launcher =

Indian long-range multiple launch rocket system

Pinaka
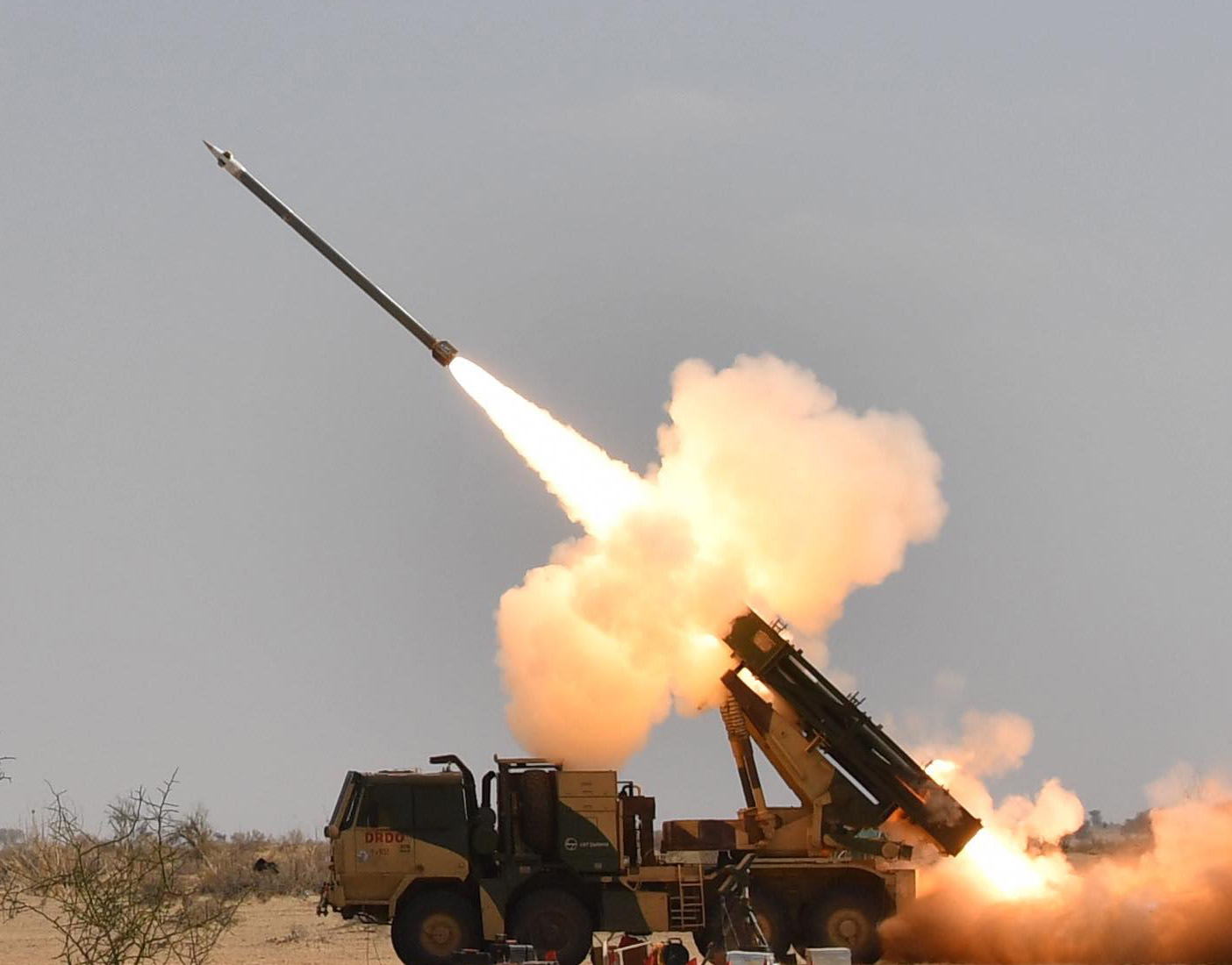
- Pinaka multi-barrel rocket launcher
- Type: Multiple launch rocket system
- Place of origin: India

Service history
- Used by: See Operators
- Wars: Kargil War

Production history
- Designer: Armament Research and Development Establishment
- Designed: 1986-present
- Manufacturer: Rocket & Ammunition; Yantra India; Munitions India; Solar Group; Launchers & other vehicles; Tata Advanced Systems; Larsen & Toubro; BEML
- Unit cost: ₹430 crore (equivalent to ₹552 crore or US$59 million in 2026) per regiment
- Produced: 1994-present
- Variants: See Specifications

Specifications
- Barrels: 8 or 12
- Rate of fire: 8 rockets per launcher in 44 seconds; 12 rockets per launcher or 72 rockets per battery under 44 seconds
- Effective firing range: Mark I: 37.5 km (23.3 mi); Enhanced: 45 km (28 mi); Mark II: 60 km (37 mi); Guided Pinaka: 75 km (47 mi); Mark II ER: 90 km (56 mi); LRGR-120 (Mk-III): 120 km (75 mi); Mark IV: 300 km (190 mi)
- Warhead: HMX (high explosive fragmentation, cluster munition–incendiary, anti-personnel, anti-tank, mine-laying)
- Engine: T-930 multi-fuel turbocharged V8 engine with intercooler
- Payload capacity: 22 tonne
- Suspension: Leaf spring and air suspension with telescopic shock absorbers
- Propellant: High-energy composite solid fuel
- Operational range: ~800 km (vehicle)
- Flight altitude: 40 km (25 mi)
- Maximum speed: Rocket: Mach 4.7; Launcher: 80 km/h (50 mph)
- Accuracy: ~ 10 m
- Transport: BEML-Tatra T813 8WD; BEML-Tatra T815 8WD

Pinaka (lit. 'Bow of Lord Shiva') is a multiple launch rocket system produced in India and developed by the Defence Research and Development Organisation (DRDO) for the Indian Army. The multi-barrel rocket launcher (MBRL) has a maximum range of 45 km (28 mi) for Mark-I Enhanced and 120 km (75 mi) for Long Range Guided Rocket (LRGR) version, and can fire a salvo of 12 HE rockets per launcher in 44 seconds. The system is mounted on a Tatra truck frame. Pinaka saw service during the Kargil War, where it was successful in neutralising Pakistani positions on the mountain tops. It has since been inducted into the Indian Army in large numbers.

In April 2013, ₹1,388.80 crore (equivalent to ₹26 billion or US$280 million in 2026) was sanctioned for increasing the production capacity of Pinaka rockets from then 1,000 to 5,000 per year. Unutilised land of the Yantra India Limited was also being considered for further capacity expansion when production of advanced variants would commence. The expansion was completed by 2014.

== Development ==
In 1981, in response to the Indian Army's need for a long range artillery system, the Indian Ministry of Defence (MoD) sanctioned two confidence building projects. In July 1983, the Army formulated their General Staff Qualitative Requirement (GSQR) for the system. The system was envisioned to supplant and replace the Indian built units of the BM-21 The Armament Research & Development Establishment (ARDE) was appointed the System Coordinator for the project. The project included seven other laboratories of the DRDO, such as the Combat Vehicles Research and Development Establishment (CVRDE), High Energy Materials Research Laboratory (HEMRL) and Electronics and Radar Development Establishment (LRDE).

Induction was planned at the rate of one Regiment per year from 1994 onwards. This system would eventually replace the BM-21 Grad and BM-30 Smerch of the Indian Army. The Army specified a maximum range of 45 km and a low circular error probability. Eight different types of Warheads were developed for the Pinaka rocket, which should be reloadable within five minutes.

== Ammunition ==
=== Mark 1 ===
Development began in December 1986, with a sanctioned budget of ₹26.47 crore (equivalent to ₹393 crore or US$42 million in 2026). The development was to be completed in December 1992. As per a report the prototype was rolled out by 1992. The user trials of the system by the Army began by February 1999 after the developmental trials. The user trials ended in December 1999. The first order for full-rate production was placed with Ordnance Factory in 2007.

The Pinaka is in the process of further improvement. Israel Military Industries cooperated with DRDO to implement its Trajectory Correction System (TCS) on the Pinaka, for further improvement of its CEP. Said programme is indicated to have greatly increased the CEP of the Pinaka The rockets can also be guided by GPS to improve their accuracy. A wraparound microstrip antenna has been developed by DRDO for this system.

Sagem completed delivery of its Sigma 30 laser-gyro artillery navigation and pointing system for two Pinaka MBRL systems in June 2010. The Sigma 30 artillery navigation and pointing system is designed for high-precision firing at short notice. The systems would be integrated by Tata Power SED and Larsen & Toubro. The system was ordered in February 2008.

To decrease single source dependency from Ordnance Factory Board (OFB) and increase competition in product pricing front, final developmental trials of Pinaka manufactured fully by Indian private sector Solar Industries under Transfer of Technology agreement from DRDO were successfully conducted by Indian Army at Pokhran Range on 19 August 2020.

By December 2021, the trials of rockets developed by Economic Explosives Ltd. (subsidiary of Solar Industries Group) and Yantra India Limited–Munitions India Limited (YIL–MIL) were underway for two variants, Mk-I Enhanced and Mk-I ADM. The order for these variants were to be placed with one or two of the competitors in order to replace the shorter ranged Mk-I variant rockets.

The Area Denial Munition (ADM) Type-1's warhead comprises a DPICM sub-munitions offering anti-access/area denial capabilities to the force against mechanised forces, vehicles and personnel. The orders for ADM Type 1 was placed on 6 February 2025.

=== Enhanced ===
Pinaka-ER.

The Pinaka Enhanced variant, also known as Enhanced Pinaka Rocket System, was developed as an increased range of 45–60 km (28–37 mi) with a reduced length. The rocket is associated with the upgraded Enhanced Pinaka Rocket System, or Pinaka Extended Range System. The production partner of the rocket is Economic Explosives Ltd. (subsidiary of Solar Industries Group) which received the technology transfer. The first firing trial of the variant was conducted on 4 November 2020 from the Integrated Test Range, Chandipur. This will also replace the older Mark 1 variant in production. Further tests were undertaken on 24 June 2021.

The orders for High Explosive, Preformed Fragmentation Mk-1 (Enhanced) rockets was placed with the Munitions India Limited on 6 February 2025. The HEPF Mk-1 (E) is an advanced variant of the in-service HEPF.

The Solar Defence & Aerospace Limited (SDAL) has also secured contracts for the munition. Its rockets completed the proof firing on 18 March 2026 while the first batch was delivered on 19 March. The proof tests for the MIL's batch is also scheduled in the same month.

=== Guided Pinaka ===
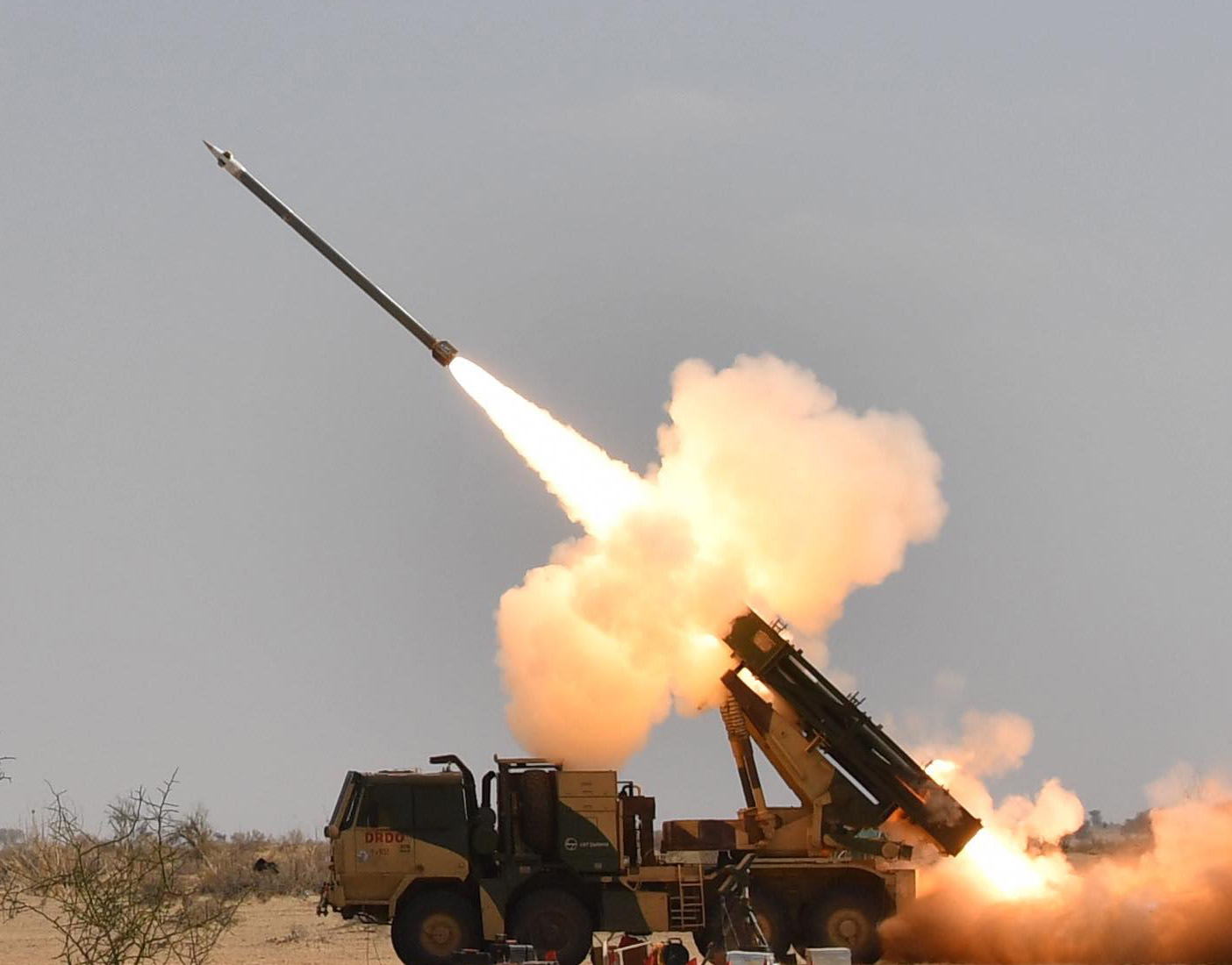
Guided Pinaka test on 11 March 2019

The Guided Pinaka rockets is a variant of Mark II and is associated with the Guided Pinaka Weapon System. It is equipped with a navigation, guidance, control kit and has considerably enhanced the range and accuracy of the missile. The rocket has an enhanced range of 75–80 km (47–50 mi) with an accuracy of 60–80 m (200–260 ft) at all ranges. The rockets are equipped with Inertial Navigation System (INS) and Global Positioning System (GPS).

As of September 2022, Defence Acquisition Council (DAC) has cleared the procurement proposal of induction of Guided Pinaka variant. The flight frials of Guided Pinaka as part of validation trials were completed in November 2024.

The first batch of Guided Pinaka rockets were flagged off by the Indian Defence Minister, Rajnath Singh, for export to the Armenian Ground Forces from the Rocket Assembly area, Pinaka Rocket manufacturing facility, Nagpur facility of Solar Defence & Aerospace Limited (SDAL) on 18 January 2026. The Medium Caliber Ammunition Manufacturing Facility was also inaugurated the same day. The fully-automated facility will supply 30 mm ammunition for the Indian Army and Navy. The tender to acquire the variant for the Indian Army was being finalised.

== Further development ==
=== Mark 2 ===
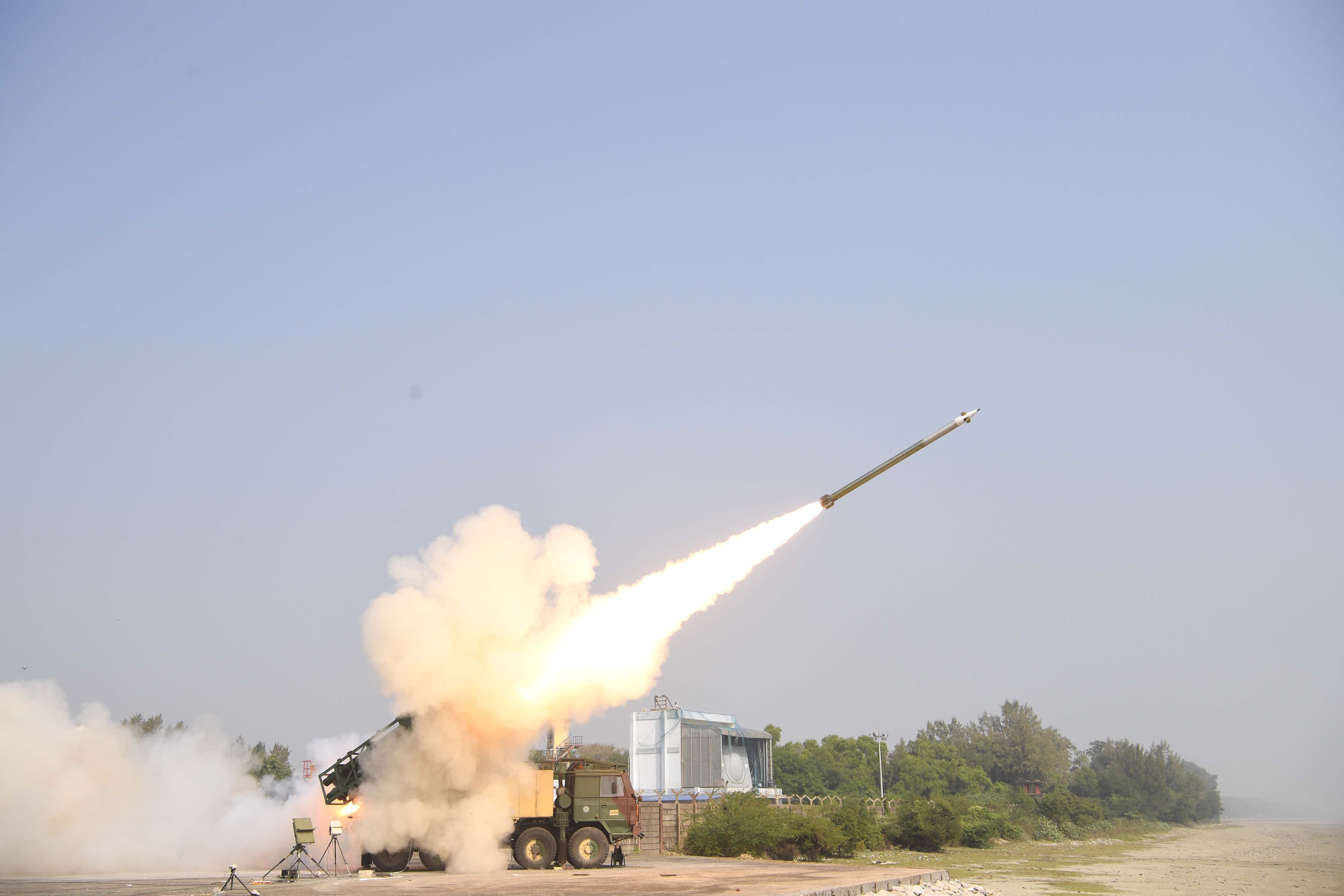
Pinaka rockets being fired in salvo mode on 20 December 2019.

Pinaka Mk II was being developed by Armament Research and Development Establishment (ARDE), Pune; Research Centre Imarat (RCI), Hyderabad; and Defence Research and Development Laboratory (DRDL), Hyderabad. This is the second generation variant of Pinaka MBRL.

Pinaka Mark 2 was pursued as part of an incremental development approach to extend the range of Pinaka Mark 1, while the Guided Pinaka emerged as a parallel derivative focused on improving accuracy and precision through the addition of a guidance section.

The Pinaka Mark 2 rockets manufactured by Solar Industries completed the User Assisted Technical Trial (UATT) on 8 December 2021 and would then go for user trial which was expected for completion by March 2022. Meanwhile, Yantra India Limited–Munitions India Limited (YIL–MIL) was yet to complete development of the Mark 2 prototype due to delay in transfer of technology from ARDE.

=== LRGR 120 ===
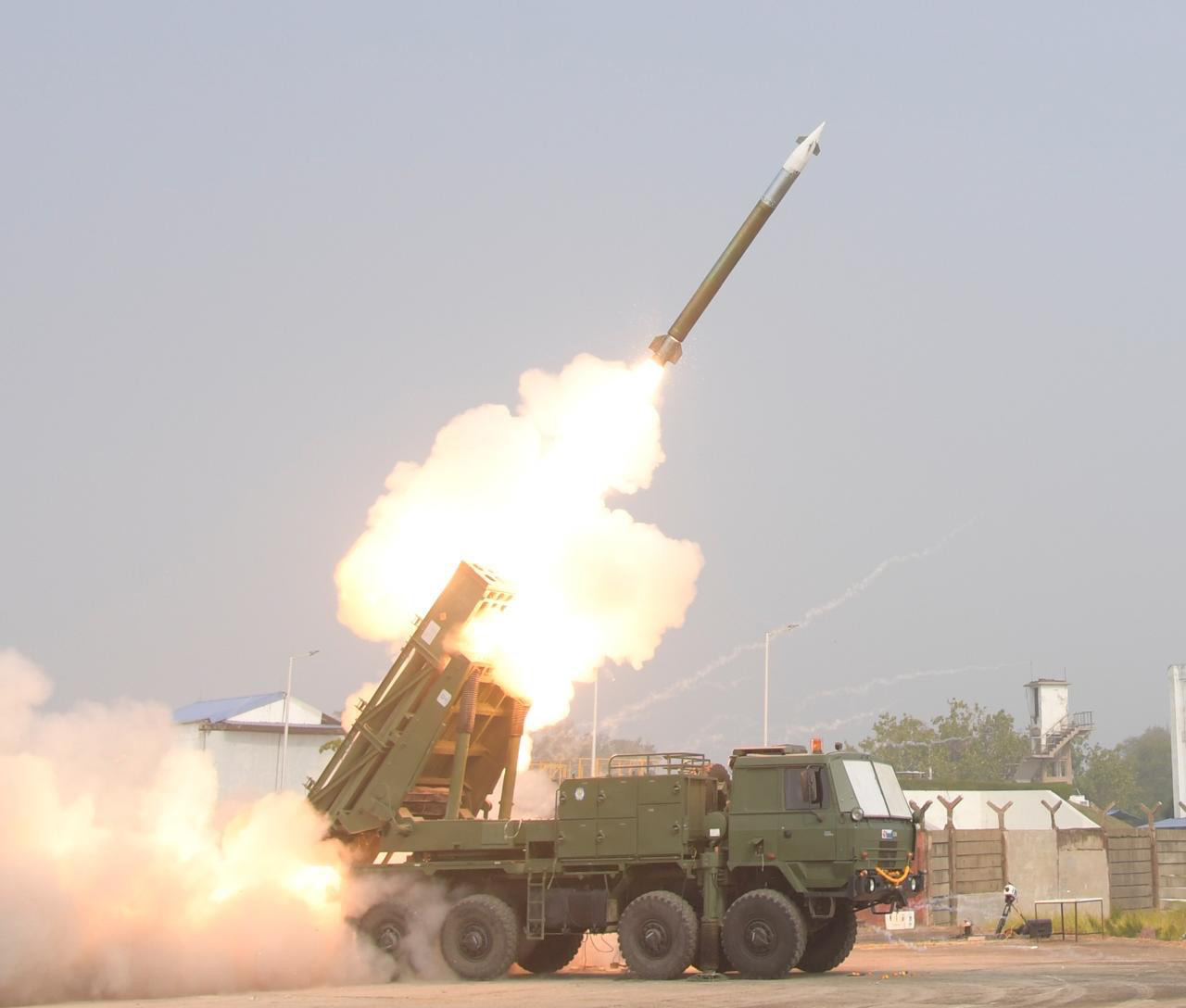
Pinaka LRGR with 120 km range.

In 2005, ARDE revealed about the development of a long range MRL similar to the Smerch MRLS.

On 17 January 2024, reports revealed that DRDO is developing two new variants of Pinaka rockets, one with a range of 120 km and the other with a range of over 200 km. The approval for the development of the system was granted by the Indian Army to DRDO's ARDE along with a 300 km-range rocket variant by 24 January. The Preliminary Services Qualitative Requirements of the variant was being formulated which specified the essential and desirable parameters of a weapon systems. The desirable parameters would be incorporated at a later stage of development.

As of February 2025, the developmental trials for 120 km-range rockets are expected to commence within few months. The development process began in 2024, and the first test is scheduled for October 2025. In August, static trials of propulsion systems were conducted and configuration design was completed. Economic Explosives Limited has developed the LRGR 120 rocket system's pre-production units.

The rockets has a length of 4.8 m (16 ft) with a 300 mm (12 in) calibre. The rocket weight is 535 kg (1,179 lb) while a carrying a warhead of 110 kg (240 lb). Each launcher can carry 2 pods of LRGR rockets with 4 munitions each. The CEP is expected to be under 30 m for all ranges. The rocket would be compatible with four kinds of warheads — high-explosive pre-fragmented (HEPF), penetration-cum-blast (PCB), thermobaric (TB) and cluster.

As per reports published in December 2025, the Indian Army has initiated a project to induct 120 km range Pinaka rockets at a cost of ₹2,500 crore (equivalent to ₹26 billion or US$280 million in 2026). The service had sent a proposal to the defence ministry to be considered by the Defence Acquisition Council (DAC). The rockets would be compatible with in-service Pinaka launchers. The project, referred to as Long Range Guided Rockets, was cleared by the DAC on 29 December.

The rocket has undergone two trials in November 2025 and July 2026 which demonstrated the rocket's ability to strike targets at both maximum and minimum user defined ranges of 120 km and 60 km, respectively.

=== ELRGR ===
The development of a rocket variant of the Pinaka system with a range of over 200 km was first revealed in January 2024. The exact range was later identified as 300 km. The approval for the development of the system was granted by the Indian Army to DRDO's ARDE along with the 120 km-range rocket variant by 24 January. The developmental status was not reported by then.

In late August 2026, the Research Centre Imarat floated a tender to acquire 5 sets of rocket systems for 370 mm Extended Long Range Guided Rocket (ELRGR). The tender demands advanced manufacturing procedure including flow forming of rocket motor cases, machining, welding of 11-10 precipitation hardening (PH) stainless steel as well as proof pressure testing. The delivery timeline would be six months.

As per a February 2026 report, DRDO was also exploring a 450 kilometer range version of the Pinaka MBRL.

Ejectable Rocket Ignition System

For the LRGR 120, ARDE is developing a modular ignition system to increase range, fuel efficiency, and reduce rocket reloading time. In order to lessen the rocket's weight while in flight, it is made to detach from the rocket after launch.

=== Ramjet propulsion ===
A group of researchers led by Lieutenant General P.R. Shankar, a professor in the aerospace department at IIT Madras and the former Director General of Artillery for the Indian Army Combat and Combat Support Arms, are developing ramjet propulsion technology that will be incorporated into the Pinaka rockets. It is anticipated that the range of 210–214 mm rocket will increase at 225–250 km with the addition of ramjet propulsion, all the while preserving the operational flexibility of the system.

The development is expected to begin soon as of January 2026. The system will enhance the BM-21 Agnibaan's range from 40 km (25 mi) to 80 km (50 mi) and LRGR-120's range to 250 km (160 mi). The development for BM-21 rockets is expected to span between March 2026 and 2028-end The design will then be transferred to a company for production. This will be followed by development for the Pinaka variant.

=== Air Force and Navy variants ===
In February 2025, it was reported that DRDO has commenced development of Pinaka variant for naval and air force applications. The DRDO has already received the Provisional Staff Qualitative Requirements (PSQR) from the Navy. The naval variant with a range of 75 km is to be flight tested in 2025 and will have underwater applications including submarine countermeasures. The Air Force also intends to operate surface-to-surface variants as a cost-effective alternative to Pralay missile as well as an air-to-surface variant for integration on the Mirage-2000, HAL Tejas and the Su-30MKI.

== Testing ==
Pinaka MBRL firing

- The first tests of the rocket system (Pinaka Mk-I) was conducted in late 1990, around 1995.
- User trials of the Pinaka Mk-I was carried out from February to December in 1999. It also took part in the Kargil War.
- From 30 to 31 January 2013, seven rounds of Pinaka Mk-I were successfully fired from the test range of Proof and Experimental Establishment (PXE) at Chandipur for developmental trials. The tests were conducted by personnel of Armament Research & Development Establishment (ARDE) between 11:00 am and 12:00 pm IST on 31 January. The tests were conducted at a range of 30 km.
- On 28 July 2013, successful firing trials of Pinaka Mk-II were conducted in the Chandan area of Pokhran Range, Rajasthan by DRDO and Army personnel. The rockets destroyed the targets in Keru area, 30 km from the point of launch.
- On 7 August 2013, tests for two rounds of Pinaka Mk-II fired from the test range of PXE at Chandipur failed to provide desired results.
- On 20 December 2013, six rounds of Pinaka Mk-II were successfully fired from the test range of PXE at Chandipur for developmental trials. This test, conducted by ARDE personnel, was reportedly conducted post a failed attempt to test the same variant four months back in August.
- On 30 May 2014, three rounds of Pinaka Mk-II were successfully fired from the test range of PXE at Chandipur by ARDE. The rockets were launched at a range of 61 km against its then maximum range of 65 km.
- On 20 May 2016, two rounds of Pinaka rockets were fired from the test range of PXE at Chandipur at 11:35 pm IST and 01:15 pm IST to validate a new technology in order to incorporate a new guidance system. The objective was to record data from the flights for further analysis which will be used for the future guided Pinaka. The tests were successful. On 23 May 2016, further two Pinaka rockets were successfully fired again from the same range.
- On 12 and 24 January 2017, maiden successful trials of the Guided Pinaka was conducted in two phases at range of 65 km and 75 km, respectively, from Launch Complex-III (LC-III), Integrated Test Range (ITR), Chandipur. The second trial was conducted at 12:45 pm IST.
- On 30 May 2018, two rounds of tests of the Guided Pinaka were successfully conducted from the PXE at Chandipur.
- On 11 and 12 March 2019, Guided Pinaka rockets were fired twice and once, respectively at the Pokhran Range, Rajasthan. All the trials were successful.
- On 19 December 2019, a Guided Pinaka version rocket was tested at a range of 75 km.
- On 20 December 2019, two Guided Pinaka variant rockets, with live warheads, were fired in salvo mode at an interval of 60 seconds at low range of 20 km at 11:00 am IST from the Integrated Test Range, Chandipur. The proximity fuse initiation and accuracy at low ranges. A newer Pinaka variant was reported to be flight tested at a range of up to 90 km.
- On 19 August 2020, six Pinaka Mk I rockets, manufactured by Economic Explosives Ltd. of Solar Group, were tested successfully from Pokhran Range, Rajasthan. This was the first time in India that a munition of this kind was manufactured and tested by a private sector company. On 20 August 2020, trials for Pinaka Guided was carried out for the first time.
- On 4 November 2020, a series of 6 Pinaka Mk I Enhanced variant rockets, manufactured by Economic Explosives Ltd. of Solar Group, were tested successfully from Integrated Test Range, Chandipur. The variant is expected to replace the older Mark I variant in production. This time DRDO has decreased the size of the rockets compared to the older generation Mark I.
- On 24 June 2021, DRDO successfully fired 25 Pinaka Mk I Enhanced variant at a range of 45 km in quick succession mode as part of saturation attack simulation. The rockets were manufactured by EEL. On 25 June 2021, DRDO successfully test fired 40 km range Enhanced Range 122 mm Caliber Rocket from Multi Barrel Rocket Launchers (MBRL) which are made to replace the older BM-21 Grad rockets in the Indian Army.
- December 2021 trials: A total of 24 rockets of multiple variants were fired at Pokhran Range.
  - On 8 December 2021, Pinaka Extended Range System, earlier Pinaka Mk I Enhanced, was successfully tested at a range of 45 km. The variant was manufactured by Economic Explosives Ltd (EEL). The User Assisted Technical Trial (UATT) of Pinaka Mk-II produced by EEL was also completed the same day. Further user trials for Pinaka Mk-II variants produced by both EEL and YIL is to undergo user trials by March 2022.
  - On 10 December 2021, Pinaka Area Denial Munition (ADM) variant, equipped with Dual-Purpose Improved Conventional Munition (DPICM) was tested. The tests included the rockets manufactured by both Economic Explosives Ltd (EEL) and Yantra India Limited (YIL). While both the manufacturers claimed success of the trials, it was confirmed that for the YIL's variant 96.6% of the DPICM exploded surpassing benchmark set at 90%. During these tests, ARDE evaluated locally developed Direct-Action Self Destruction (DASD) and Anti-Tank Munition (ATM) fuses.
- In April 2022, a total of 24 Enhanced Pinaka Rocket System (EPRS) along with Pinaka ADM were fired at Pokhran Range for different ranges. The rockets developed by Yantra India Limited-Munitions India Limited (YIL-MIL) were flight tested during the trials.
- In the last two weeks of August 2022, user trials of Pinaka Enhanced were conducted from both Pokhran Range and Integrated Test Range, Balasore. Rockets developed by both the manufacturers MIL and EEL successfully passed the trials.
- On 14 November 2024, DRDO completed the final Flight Tests of Guided Pinaka Weapon Systems as part of Provisional Staff Qualitative Requirements (PSQR) Validation Trials. The tests were conducted in three phases in field firing ranges. The three parameters of PSQR, which are ranging, accuracy, consistency and rate of fire to engage multiple targets in salvo mode was assessed during the trials. A total of 12 rockets from each production agencies, Economic Explosives Ltd. (EEL) and Munitions India Limited (MIL), were tested from two launchers that were upgraded by the launcher manufacturers, Tata Advanced Systems Limited (TASL) and Larsen & Toubro (L&T).
- It was reported on 5 August 2025, that the Pinaka Mk-I Enhanced variant rockets underwent its successful test firing before the commissioning and induction into the Indian Army.
- The maiden flight test of LRGR-120, earlier referred to as Pinaka Mk 3 by reports, was conducted on 29 November 2025. The rocket struck the target at a maximum range of 120 km with textbook precision while performing all the in-flight manoeuvres planned. The launch was conducted from an in-service launcher.
- On 18 March 2026, the maiden proof trials of the Pinaka Extended Range System was undertaken in the Pokhran Field Firing Range. The Solar Industries undertook trials of two production lots, during a total of 24 Pinaka Extended Range Rockets. The rockets were fired at different ranges a varying field conditions to assess their reliability and performance. The maiden proof trials of rockets from production batches indicates the readiness of their induction and operational deployment.
- On 8 July 2026, DRDO conducted another successful flight test of Pinaka LRGR from the Integrated Test Range. The rocket demonstrated its performance at the "user defined minimum range" of 60 km while undertaking all planned in-flight manoeuvres and impacted on the target with textbook precision. The launch was conducted from an in-service Pinaka launcher.

== Details ==
Pinaka is a complete MBRL system, with Pinaka battery consisting of: six launcher vehicles, each with 12 rockets; six loader-replenishment vehicles; six replenishment vehicles; two Command Post vehicle (one stand by) with a Fire Control computer, and the DIGICORA MET radar (meteorological radar, provides data on winds). A battery of six launchers can neutralise an area of 1,000 m × 800 m. A Pinaka regiment of the Indian Army consists of three batteries.

The Army generally deploys a battery that has a total of 72 rockets. All of the 72 rockets can be fired in 44 seconds, taking out an area of 1 km^{2}. Each launcher can fire in a different direction too. The system has the flexibility to fire all the rockets in one go or only a few. This is made possible with a fire control computer. There is a command post linking together all the six launchers in a battery. Each launcher has an individual computer which enables it to function autonomously in case it gets separated from the other five vehicles in a war.

=== Network-centric operations ===
The Pinaka operates in conjunction with the Indian Army's Firefinder radars and Swathi Weapon Locating Radar. The Indian Army is networking all its artillery units together with the DRDO's Artillery Command & Control System (ACCS), which acts as a force multiplier and is in series production. The Pinaka units also uses of the Indian Army's SATA (Surveillance & Target Acquisition) Units which have been equipped with the Searcher-1, Searcher-2 and IAI Heron UAVs since late 1990s as well as the Israeli Long-Range Reconnaissance and Observation System and Indian Battle Field Surveillance radars of the Indian Army.

=== Modes of operation ===
The launcher can operate in the following modes:

Autonomous mode. The launcher is fully controlled by a fire control computer (FCC). The microprocessor on the launcher automatically executes the commands received from the FCC, giving the operator the status of the system on displays and indicators.

Stand-alone mode: In this mode, the launcher is not linked to the FCC operator, and the operator at the console enters all the commands for laying of the launcher system and selection of firing parameters.

Remote mode: In this mode, a launcher computer (LC) in a remote control unit carried outside the cabin up to a distance of about 200 m can be used to control the launcher system, the launcher site and to unload the fired rocket pods from the launcher.

Manual mode: All launcher operations including laying of the system and firing are manually controlled. This mode is envisaged in the situations where the microprocessor fails or where there is no power to activate the microprocessor-based operator's console. To ensure deployment flexibility, operational initialization is managed by either a dial sight or an Automatic Gun Alignment and Pointing System (AGAPS).

The Pinaka was tested in the Kargil conflict and proved its effectiveness. Since then it has been inducted into the Indian Army and series production has been ordered. The Pinaka MBRL is stated to be cheaper than other systems. It costs ₹2.3 crore (US$250,000) per system compared to the M270 which costs ₹19.5 crore (US$2.1 million).

Salient features

- Use of state-of-the-art technologies for improved combat performance.
- Total operational time optimised for shoot & scoot capability with automatic leveling and stabilization.
- Cabin pressurisation for crew protection in addition to blast shields.
- Microprocessor-based fully automatic positioning and fire control console.
- Night vision devices for driver and crew.
- Neutralisation/destruction of the exposed troop concentrations, B-Class military land vehicles and other such soft targets.
- Neutralisation of enemy guns/rocket locations.
- Laying of anti-personnel and anti-tank mines at a short notice. For 12 rockets, the maximum rocket programming time is 20 seconds.

== Orders ==
While DRDO was responsible for the overall design and development of the Pinaka, its partners played a significant role in developing important subsystems and components. They include Tata Power SED (now Tata Advanced Systems; involved in the project since 1989), Larsen & Toubro, Solar Industries, Munitions India Limited and Yantra India Limited. As of August 2024, of the total Pinaka systems in service with the Army, Tata has delivered 40 launchers and 8 Command Posts, with another 36 launchers on order. A technology transfer licensing agreement for the Pinaka and Battery Command Post was signed by DRDO and NIBE Limited on 30 May 2025. Strengthening the industrial foundation for the creation and production of domestic defense equipment is the goal of the agreement.

- On 29 March 2006, the Indian Army awarded Tata Power SED and Larsen & Toubro's Heavy Engineering Division a contract worth ₹200 crore (equivalent to ₹701 crore or US$75 million in 2026), to produce 40 Pinaka MBRLs each for two regiments. Tata Power SED declared that it would be delivering the first units within six months. The deliveries were completed by 2010.
- On 29 October 2015, the Defence Acquisition Council (DAC) chaired by the Defence Minister of India, cleared purchase of two more Pinaka regiments at a cost of ₹3,300 crore (US$350 million). On March 18, 2016, the Cabinet Committee on Security (CCS) cleared the acquisitions. As a consequence, a deal worth ₹200 crore (US$21 million) was signed with Tata Power SED for delivery of one regiment (20 launchers and 8 command posts). Another regiment was ordered with Larsen & Toubro. The contract was signed with BEML (for vehicles), Tata Power SED and Larsen & Toubro (for launchers and command posts) and Ordnance Factory Board (rocket ammunition). The entire order was placed in 2016 and all units have been delivered as of 2024.
- In November 2016, the MoD has cleared a RFP for six additional regiments and was followed by Defence Acquisition Council (DAC) clearance in 2018. This led to the signing of a contract on 31 August 2020 for six additional regiments worth of launcher systems at ₹2,580 crore (equivalent to ₹33 billion or US$350 million in 2026) from Tata Power SED and Larsen & Toubro (L&T). Defence public sector undertaking Bharat Earth Movers Ltd (BEML) which will provide the vehicles will also be part of the project. The contract will include "114 launchers with Automated Gun Aiming & Positioning System (AGAPS), 45 Command Posts to be procured from TPCL and L&T, and 330 Vehicles from BEML." This regiment will be equipped with navigation, guidance and control kit for Guided Pinaka rockets. While Tata will deliver two regiments, the rest will be delivered by L&T. The deliveries were to be completed by 2024.
  - As of June 2025, the first two of the regiments have been raised .
  - Two additional regiments are expected to be raised within due months as of June 2025 while the final two regiments will be raised in 2026. The Army plans to convert the existing heavy mortar regiments equipped with 120mm-calibre mortars into Pinaka regiments.
  - As reported on 15 March 2026, the Army had inducted and operationalised the third regiment while the fourth has been raised and has received over half of its equipment. The final two are now expected to be operationalised in 2027.
- On 13 December 2023, the Ministry of Defence cleared the acquisition of 6,400 Pinaka ADM Type 2 and Type 3 rockets at a cost of over ₹2,800 crore (equivalent to ₹31 billion or US$330 million in 2026). Two main contenders for the order are Economic Explosives Ltd. (EEL) and Munitions India Limited (MIL).
- On 29 January 2025, an acquisition of Pinaka rocket ammunition was cleared by the Cabinet Committee on Security (CCS). The order is valued at ₹10,147 crore (equivalent to ₹100 billion or US$1.1 billion in 2026). The order includes two contracts of different ammunition variants for the 10 Pinaka regiments on order. The contract was finally signed on 6 February 2025.
  - A contract was signed with Economic Explosives Ltd. (EEL) at a cost of ₹4,500 crore (equivalent to ₹46 billion or US$500 million in 2026) for the procurement of Area Denial Munition Type 1 (DPICM) with a range of 37 km.
  - Another contract was signed with Munitions India Limited (MIL) at a cost of ₹5,700 crore (equivalent to ₹59 billion or US$630 million in 2026) for the procurement of High Explosive Preformed Fragmentation Mk-1 (Enhanced) rockets [HEPF Mk-1 (E)] with a range of 45 km.
- On 6 and 8 January 2026, Tata Advanced Systems and Larsen & Toubro received an order from Indian Army's 510 Advance Base Workshop (ABW) for the upgrade, overhaul and obsolescence management of in-service-first-generation Pinaka Multiple Launch Rocket Systems (MLRS) and Battery Command Posts (BCPs). In the first phase, a pilot project of overhaul of select Pinaka MLRS and BCPs will be undertaken by Tata-L&T and 510 ABW. This will followed by the same for the remaining units by 510 ABW and Corps of EME where Tata and L&T will provide critical spares, quality assurance and technical support. The partnership is meant to provide long-term operational availability and modernisation of the Pinaka regiments currently in service with the Army. The model will also be used as a "blueprint" in future in similar lifecycle management and upgrade programmes for other systems.

== Service history ==
=== India ===
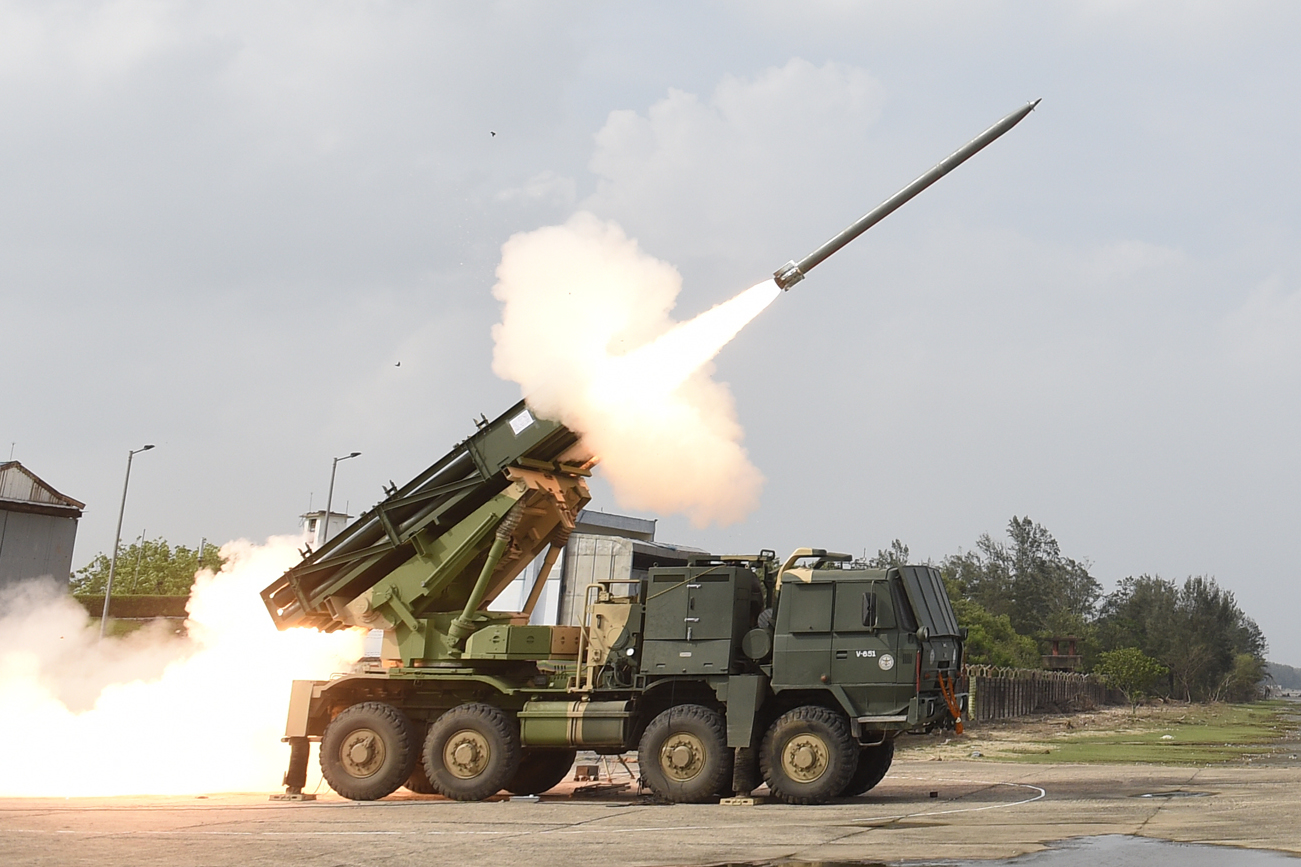
Pinaka Mark 1 Enhanced rocket being test fired on 24 June 2021.

A section of two launchers were deployed in June 1999 during the Kargil War under the 121 Rocket Regiment.

In February 2000, the first Pinaka regiment was raised.

The first two regiments of Pinaka were inducted by 2010. As of 2016, the Indian Army had plans to operate 10 regiments by 2022 and further increase the numbers to 22 regiments within 2032. The Pinaka system will replace the older Grad MLRS regiments are being retired.

It was reported in March 2024, that the Army plans to raise 2 more Pinaka regiments by the end of year along Line of Actual Control. The regiments were raised by June 2025. Moreover, training is underway as of 23 June 2025 for two additional regiments which are planned to be raised and operationalised within two months. Also, the equipment for the final two regiments as part of the six-regiment order is scheduled to arrive by the end of the year while the regiments are to be operationalised in early 2026.

Amidst the 2025 India–Pakistan standoff, firing practices of Pinaka MBRL was conducted in the Pokhran Field Firing Range (PFFR) early in the month of May. Further practices were to be conducted "in a few weeks' time".

As on 15 March 2026, the Army had inducted and operationalised the seventh regiment while the eighth has been raised and has received over half of its equipment. The ninth and tenth are now expected to be inducted in 2027.

Pinaka, Pralay, Nirbhay and BrahMos will become part of the Integrated Rocket Force (IRF), a separate entity from Strategic Forces Command.

=== Armenia ===
Armenia signed a combined deal worth ₹2,000 crore (equivalent to ₹23 billion or US$247 million in 2026) for 4 Pinaka batteries and other defense equipment. The order includes supplies of extended range and guided rocket for Pinaka system in the future. Deliveries began in July 2023, and concluded by November 2024. Armenia has received three Pinaka variants, including the guided Pinaka. In Armenian service they have been renamed as Shant (lit. 'Lightning').

The Armenian Ground Forces was the first to receive the Guided Pinaka, even before the Indian Army, as the first batch was flagged off from the Pinaka Rocket manufacturing facility of Solar Defence & Aerospace Limited (SDAL) based in Nagpur on 18 January 2026. As of March, the last consignment of the guided munition variant was dispatched in February while the latter batches are on hold since the 2026 Iran war has complicated logistics and the route of supply. Solar Defence supplied 700 Guided Pinaka rockets to Armenia until November 2026.

=== Potential operators ===
As of October 2022, Indonesia and Nigeria have also shown interest in Pinaka multi-barrel rocket launcher.

As of June 2024, some Southeast Asian and European nations has also shown interest to acquire Pinaka MBRL and Netra AEW&C.

On 9 November 2024, Brigadier General Stephane Richou confirmed to Asian News International about the French Army evaluating Pinaka MBRL system for their requirement. This was mentioned during the visit of the high-ranking official who said that that "two countries share much more than just a business relationship and want to cooperate more". French Army chief, Army General Pierre Schill, during his visit to India in October 2025 expressed his interest in the longer-range variant of Pinaka. It is expected to be a reciprocal purchase following Indian acquisition of 114 Rafale jets.France intents to use it as an interim purchase between the phase-out of the M270 MLRS and the induction of the FLP-T MLRS systems.

In November 2026, Firstpost reported that the Philippines is considering acquisition of multiple batteries of Pinaka for the Philippine Army.

== Specifications ==
	Pinaka Mk-I	Pinaka ADM (Note: Area Denial Munition)	Pinaka ER (Note: Extended Range, also called Enhanced Pinaka)	Pinaka Mk-II	Guided Pinaka	ERR 122	Pinaka Mk-III (LRGR-120) (Note: Long Range Guided Rocket) (Note: Citations for specifications:)	Pinaka Mk-IV (ELRGR) (Note: Extended Long Range Guided Rocket)
Range	37.5 km (23.3 mi)		45–50 km (28–31 mi)	60 km (37 mi)	75–80 km (47–50 mi)	40 km (25 mi)	120 km (75 mi)	200–300 km (120–190 mi)
Length	4.88 m (16.0 ft)		4.72 m (15.5 ft)	5.17 m (17.0 ft)		2.91 m (9 ft 7 in)	4.8 m (16 ft)	Unknown
Rocket Diameter	214 mm (8.4 in)					122 mm (4.8 in)	300 mm (12 in)	370 mm (15 in)
Warhead weight	100 kg (220 lb)				100 kg (220 lb) + 15 kg (33 lb) for GNC kit	21 kg (46 lb)	110 kg (240 lb)	Unknown
Rocket Weight	277.4 kg (612 lb)		280 kg (620 lb)	325 kg (717 lb)		66.5 kg (147 lb)	535 kg (1,179 lb)	Unknown
Propellant Weight	100 kg (220 lb)		111 kg (245 lb)	131.5 kg (290 lb)		26.8 kg (59 lb)	Unknown	Unknown
Rate of fire	Approximately 44 seconds.					40 rockets in 20 seconds	Unknown	Unknown
Accuracy	≤1.5% range.; <60m CEP at 30 km (19 mi) with Trajectory Correction System.		≤1.5% range.		<30m CEP at 20–75 km (12–47 mi).; Achieved <10m CEP in 2017. Enhanced to 2-3m CEP.	≤1.5% range.	≤30 m CEP (at all ranges)	Unknown
Salvo reload time	4 minutes.					Unknown	Unknown	Unknown
Warheads	PF, RHE	DPICM, Anti-tank mines	HEPF, RHE			HEPF, RHE	HEPF, PCB, TB, Cluster	Unknown
Detonation mechanism	Contact + Delay, Electronic time and Proximity fuze					Contact and Proximity fuze	Unknown	Unknown
Guidance	Free flight			Unknown	RLG-INS + MEMS-IMU + multi-GNSS	Free flight	RLG-INS + mid-course update + terminal correction	Unknown
Flight stabilization	4 curved wrapped around fins		6 flat wrapped around fins		6 flat wrapped around fins (without fin cant)	4 curved wrapped around fins	Unknown	Unknown
Launching pod	2 detachable pods, each carrying 6 rockets					Fixed cluster of 40 rockets	2 detachable pods, each carrying 4 rockets	Unknown
Launcher	Based on a Kolos Tatra truck for high mobility licence produced in India by BEML.; The truck features a central type regulation system; the driver can adjust the tyre pressure to suit the terrain for optimum mobility.; Six launchers per battery.; Launchers are NBC protected, have their own computerized fire control system, and automatic positioning system.; Designed for shoot and scoot fire missions by using inertial navigation system.; A battery (six launchers) can neutralize an area of roughly 1,000 × 800 m at 40 km range.; The launcher assembly has electro-magnetic elevation and traverse, with traverse being 90° left and right of the centreline and elevation up to 55°.					Upgraded BM-21 Grad by Larsen & Toubro. Based on Ashok Leyland Super Stallion chassis.	Each launcher carrying 8 guided rockets can neutralize an area of roughly 700 × 500 m at 120 km range.; The rockets are capable of reaching Mach 4.6.	Unknown
Status (as of June 2025)	Inducted; mass production.	Order placed for production.	Inducted; mass production.	Under trials.	Inducted; mass production.	Under trials.	DAC cleared procurement proposal.	Army clearance received; under development.

== Operators ==
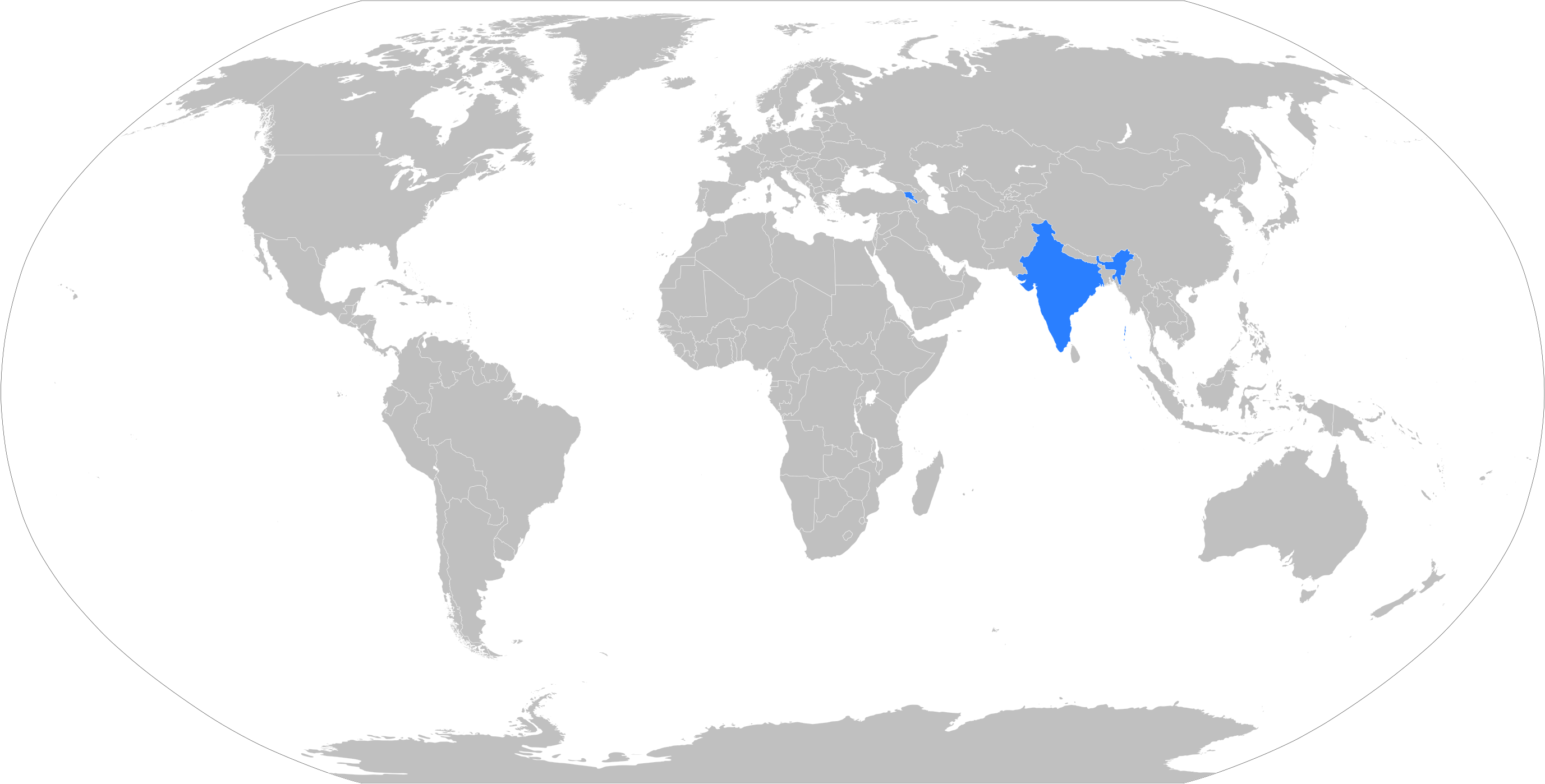
Map of Pinaka MBRL operators in blue

- India
  - Indian Army – 7 regiments (126+ launchers) of Pinaka Mk-I and Mk-II in service as of March 2026. 3 additional Mk-II regiments on order. Total 22 regiments of MK-I & MK-II planned.
- Armenia
  - Armenian Ground Forces – 4 batteries ordered in September 2022. Deliveries were conducted between July 2023 and September 2024. The delivery of Guided Pinaka rockets commenced in January 2026. Designation: Shant (lit. 'Lightning').

=== Potential Operators ===
- India
  - Indian Air Force
  - Indian Navy
- France
  - French Army: Under evaluation trials as of November 2024.

== See also ==
- 9A52-4 Tornado – (Russia)
- Astros II – (Brazil)
- BM-21 Grad – (Soviet Union)
- BM-27 Uragan – (Soviet Union)
- Fajr-5 – (Iran)
- Falaq-2 – (Iran)
- K239 Chunmoo – (South Korea)
- M142 HIMARS – (United States)
- M270 Multiple Launch Rocket System – (United States)
- Precise & Universal Launching System (PULS) – (Israel)
- T-122 Sakarya – (Turkey)
- TOROS – (Turkey)
- TOS-1 – (Soviet Union, Russia)
- Weishi rockets – (China)
