= Tata Power SED =

Indian defence manufacturing company

Tata Power Strategic Engineering Division

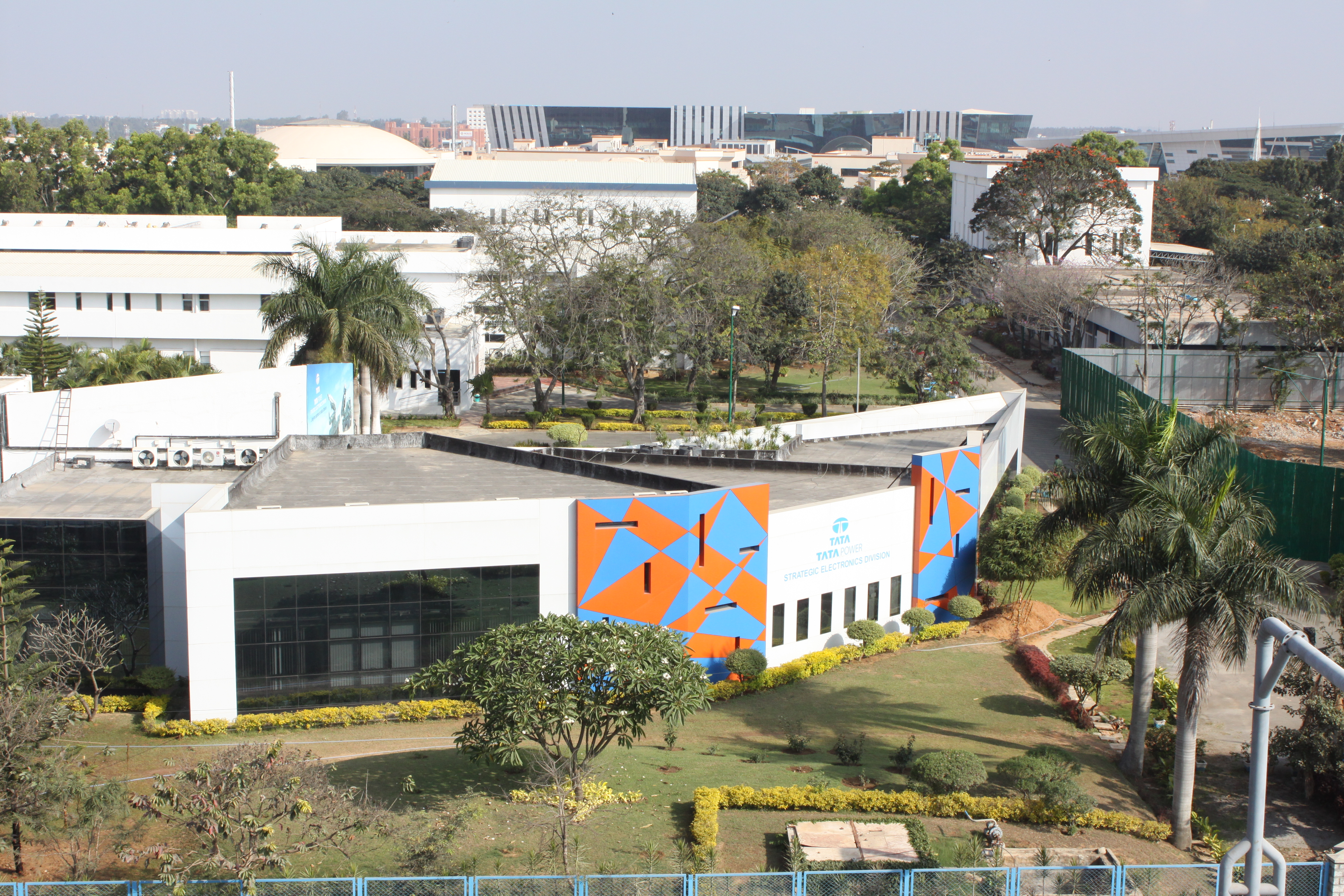
- Tata Power SED's factory in Bangalore
- Company type: Private
- Industry: Defence
- Headquarters: New Delhi, India
- Area served: India
- Parent: Tata Advanced Systems
- Website: tatapowersed.in

Tata Power SED (Tata Power Strategic Engineering Division) is an Indian defence manufacturing company and a part of the Tata Group. It was a unit of Tata Power until 2020, when Tata Advanced Systems acquired it from Tata Power. It was formerly known as Strategic Electronics Division.

== Products and services ==
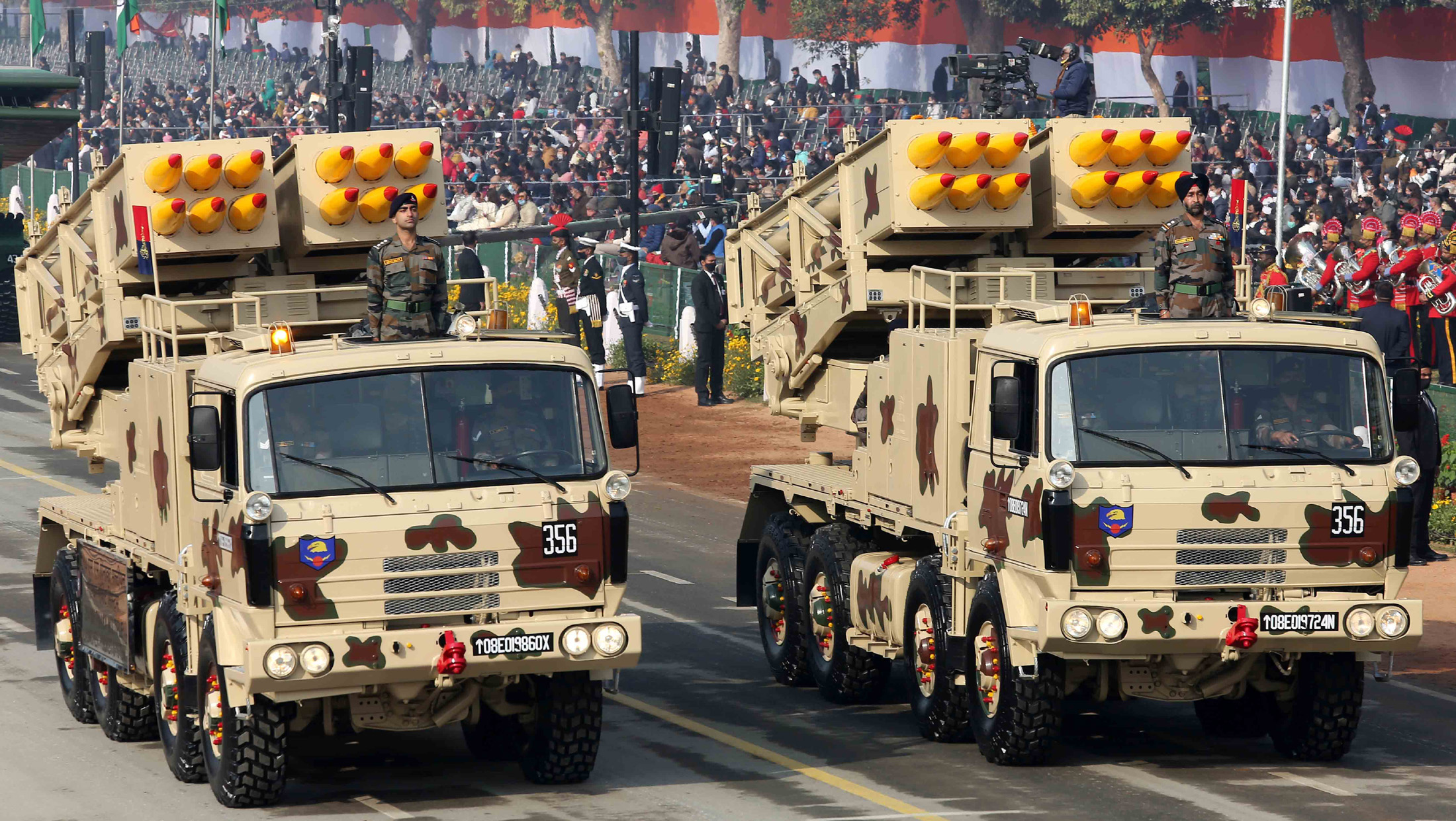
Tata Power SED is one of the manufacturers of Pinaka regiment multiple rocket launchers for the Indian Army.

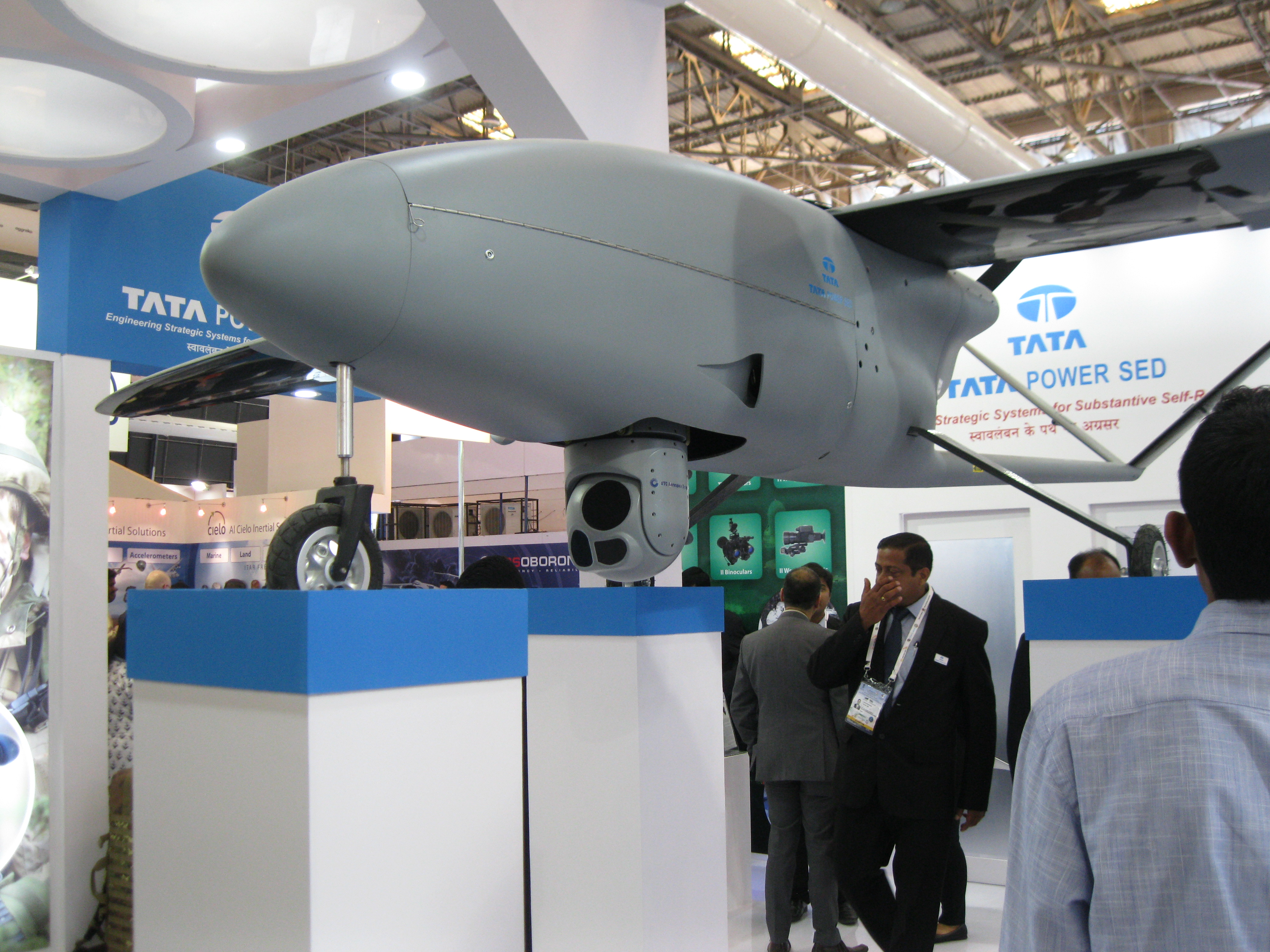
Tata Power SED at Aero India 2015.

=== Pinaka MBRL ===
Tata Power SED is the lead contractor along with Larsen & Toubro Limited for the Pinaka Multi Barrel Rocket Launcher (MBRL) system.

=== Akash missile ===
Tata power SED is building the launchers for the Akash SAM systems for the Indian Air Force.

=== Arihant-class submarine ===
Tata Power SED built the control systems for the Arihant class of submarines.

=== ATAGS Gun System ===
Developing 155 x 52 cal Artillery Gun for the Indian Army.

== Military Airfield Modernization (MAFI) ==
Tata Power SED is also active in modernizing military airfields MAFI (Military Air Field Infrastructure) programme in the country. Recently, India's Ministry of Defence awarded a ₹1600 crore ($120 million) contract to the company to modernize 37 airfields in the country. Under the first phase of MAFI programme, the company has already upgraded 30 airfields.
