= High Energy Projectile Factory =

Ammunition factory in Tamil Nadu, India

Heavy Alloy Penetrator Project
- Industry: Defence
- Headquarters: Tiruchirappalli
- Products: Tank Ammunition
- Owner: Munitions India Limited

The High Energy Projectile Factory (HEPF) is an artillery ammunition factory operated by Munitions India Limited. It was previously part the erstwhile Ordnance Factories Board of the Government of India. the factory is located about 25 kilometres from the main city of Tiruchirappalli.

== History ==
The factory was initially established in the late 1980s as a unit of Defence Research and Development Organisation in collaboration with other government defence agencies and some foreign partners. After full scale development of the product was completed, the factory was handed over to Ordnance Factories Board, to begin full-scale production. This is one of the forty one ordnance factories operated by OFB throughout India, and one of the two factories in Tiruchirappalli, the other being Ordnance Factory Tiruchirappalli (OFT). After dismantling of Ordnance Factory Board the High energy Projectile Factory become part of newly formed DPSU Munitions India Limited.

== Products ==
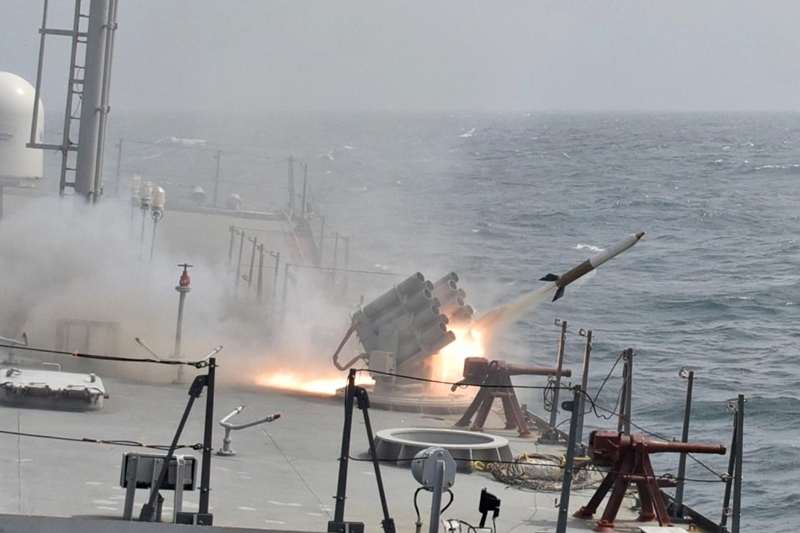
INS Chennai launching a Kavach rocket

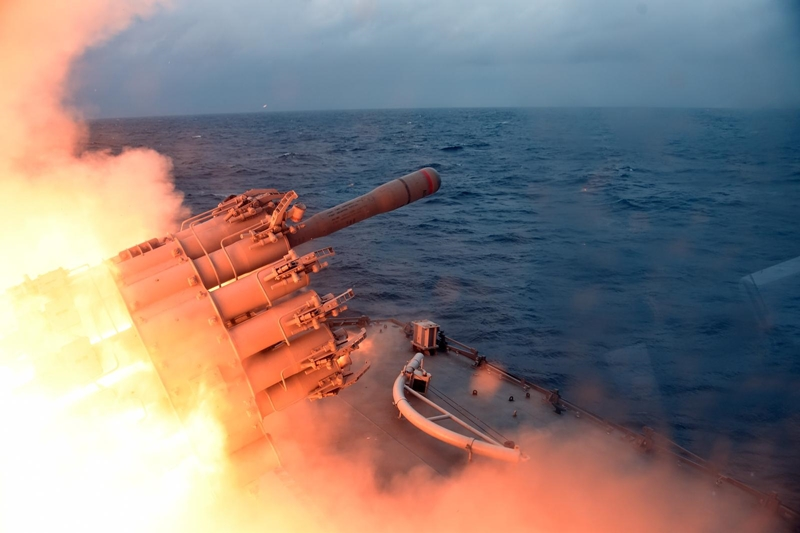
RBU-6000 Anti-Submarine Rocket

The factory produces 400 tonne per annum home-made tungsten based heavy alloy components through powder metallurgy processes to manufacture FSAPDS (Fin Stabilized Armor Piercing Discarding Sabot), alternatively called the APFSDS, which is a high kinetic energy weapon used in tank and other armor-piercing ammunition, supplied to Indian Army.
