= Troop Comforts =

Indian weapons production company

Troop Comforts Limited
- Type: Public Sector Undertaking
- Industry: Defence Production
- Predecessor: Ordnance Factory Board
- Founded: 1 October 2021; 4 years ago
- Headquarters: Ordnance Equipment Factory Kanpur, Kanpur, India
- Key people: Sunil Date (Chairman & Managing Director)
- Products: Technical textiles, apparel, environmental protection and personal utility equipment for military and civilian use
- Owner: Government of India
- Divisions: Ordnance Equipment Factory Kanpur; Ordnance Clothing Factory Shahjahanpur; Ordnance Clothing factory Avadi; Ordnance Equipment Factory, Hazratpur
- Website: troopcomfortslimited.co.in

Troop Comforts Limited (TCL) is an Indian state-owned defence company headquartered in Kanpur, India. It was established in 2021 as part of the restructuring and corporatisation of the Ordnance Factory Board into seven Public Sector Undertakings. It is involved in the manufacture of life-cycle clothing, extreme cold climate clothing, mountaineering equipment, supply drop equipment, water storage equipment, tents and other products for the Indian Armed Forces and for civilian use.

TCL consists of four factories of the erstwhile Ordnance Factory Board: the Ordnance Equipment Factory Kanpur, Ordnance Clothing Factory Shahjahanpur, Ordnance Clothing Factory Avadi, and Ordnance Equipment Factory, Hazratpur.

== See also ==
- Other PSUs formed from Ordnance Factory Board:
  - Advanced Weapons and Equipment India Limited (AWE), Kanpur
  - Armoured Vehicles Nigam Limited (AVANI), Chennai
  - Gliders India Limited (GIL), Kanpur
  - India Optel Limited (IOL), Dehradun
  - Munitions India Limited (MIL), Pune
  - Yantra India Limited (YIL), Nagpur
