= Munitions India =

Indian weapons production company

Munitions India Limited
- Type: Public Sector Undertaking
- Industry: Defence Production
- Predecessor: Ordnance Factory Board
- Founded: 1 October 2021; 5 years ago
- Headquarters: Ammunition Factory Khadki, Pune, India
- Key people: Sanjay Hazari (Chairman & Managing Director); Rakesh Ojha (Director Operations & Director HR)
- Products: Ammunition, Explosives, Rockets
- Owner: Government of India
- Divisions: Ammunition Factory Khadki; Cordite Factory Aruvankadu; High Energy Projectile Factory Tiruchirapalli; High Explosive Factory Khadki; Ordnance Factory Bhandara; Ordnance Factory Bolangir; Ordnance Factory Chanda Chandrapur; Ordnance Factory Dehu Road; Ordnance Factory Itarsi; Ordnance Factory Khamaria; Ordnance Factory Nalanda; Ordnance Factory Varangaon
- Website: https://munitionsindia.in

Munitions India Limited (MIL) is an Indian state-owned defence company, headquartered in Pune, India, established in 2021 as part of the restructuring and corporatisation of the Ordnance Factory Board into seven different Public Sector Undertakings. Munitions India primarily manufactures ammunition, explosives, rockets, and bombs for the use of the Indian Armed Forces, foreign militaries, and domestic civilian use.

The budget allocated to MIL has increased in the 2020s. The defence PSU was allocated a budget of Rs 577 crore in FY2023, Rs 580 crore in FY2024 (RE), and Rs 745.45 crore in FY2025, the highest among the seven defence PSUs. This is part of the infrastructure modernisation plan and aims to increase the war reserves of the Indian Armed Forces to sustain long-drawn wars. The sum is to be invested in modernising equipment, increasing production capacity, and including new manufacturing lines for ammunition of 30mm and 40mm grenade launchers.

== Products ==
Some notable products of Munitions India include:

- Pinaka Multi Barrel Rocket Launcher
- Hand Grenade
- High Speed Low Drag Bomb
- FSAPDS
- Shivalik Multi-Mode Hand Grenade (MMHG)
- 155 mm High Explosive Extended Range Full Bore (Boat Tail) shell
- Maindeka Naval Mine
- Air to Ground 1000 lb bombs (High Explosive, Thermobaric)
- 68 mm Air to Ground Rockets (HE, HC and Training rounds)
- Mortar Bombs (81 mm, 51 mm)
- Large Caliber Ammunition
  - 155 mm (HE M-107, Illuminating rounds, HE ERFB, Screening Smoke rounds)
  - 130 mm (HE rounds)
  - 125 mm (HE, HEAT rounds)
  - 105 mm (IFG HE, IFG Illuminating, Screening Smoke rounds)
- Medium Caliber Ammunition
  - 84 mm (HE, Smoke, Illuminating (ILLG) rounds)
  - 30 mm (HE/I, AP/T, HE/T rounds for BMP-II)
- Small Caliber Ammunition (20 mm rounds for anti-materiel rifle, 14.5×114mm, 7.62 x 51 mm, 7.62 x 54 mmR, 5.56 x 45 mm, 9×19 mm)

=== Under Development ===
==== Ramjet-Propelled Artillery Shell ====
As of February 2020, IIT Madras, in partnership with IIT Kanpur, Armament Research and Development Establishment and Research Centre Imarat, is working on redesigning an existing 155 mm shell using ramjet propulsion that can cover 60 km+ range. It will be made compatible with Haubits FH77, Dhanush, K9 Vajra-T and ATAGS. The shell will incorporate a Precision Guidance Kit for trajectory correction. IIT Madras will ensure that Munitions India can manufacture the shells. A number of technological advances have already been verified. The development team is awaiting product validation and prototyping now that the design is complete. Prototype is expected to be developed within three to four years.

The project was started in 2020 by partnering with the Army Technology Board. Early trials of a scaled down system was conducted from an IIT Madras developed 76 mm gun confirmed the fundamental idea. Internal and external ballistics were validated by subsequent testing carried out in September 2025 at the School of Artillery, which successfully demonstrated clean gun exit, stable flight, and ramjet activation.

With this approach, the range of conventional shells will be enhanced by 30–50% without losing their lethality. It was approved by the Army Technology Board. It can be retrofitted onto all the existing 155 mm artillery shells. As of December 2025, developmental tests at Pokhran Field Firing Range and IIT Madras had been successful, showing that the shell can depart the gun efficiently at wider operational zones.

By 12 January 2026, IIT Madras successfully conducted several in-house tests of the ramjet unit. The ramjet engine was incorporated into an in-service 155 mm artillery shell, replacing the traditional base bleed unit. The project is led by IIT Madras Aerospace Engineering department faculty P.A. Ramakrishna and retired Indian Army officer Lt General P R Shankar among others. Range improvements were demonstrated in trials carried out on different artillery platforms. The range in K9 Vajra-T increased from 36 km to approximately 62 km, in Dhanush, the range is from approximately 30 km to approximately 55 km, and in ATAGS, it is from approximately 40 km to nearly 70 km. A similar technology is expected to be developed for rocket artillery.

==== 155 mm Smart Artillery Shell ====
The development of 155 mm Smart Ammunition for the Regiment of Artillery by Munitions India and IIT Madras was reported in February 2024. The period of development is roughly two years. The goal is to improve the accuracy and lethality of artillery shells during terminal impact. The smart shell can be launched from 155 mm 39- and 45-calibre guns, including Dhanush, ATAGS, and K9 Vajra-T. It will achieve a circular error probable (CEP) of 10 m (33 ft) against 500 m (1,600 ft) CEP for conventional shells. It requires housing of miniaturize electronics and sensors package with a guidance, navigation, and control system. To improve accuracy, the smart artillery round will use NavIC, with a GPS backup. It will be interoperable with all of the Indian Army's artillery guns to accommodate various tactical requirements. The smart shell will incorporate three-mode fuse operation, fin stabilization, and canard control. A minimum range of 8 km (5.0 mi) and a maximum range of 38 km (24 mi) are anticipated. The smart shell will have three explosion modes: delayed, height of burst, and point detonation.

== Exports ==
The UAE purchased 40,000 and 50,000 155 mm artillery ammunition in 2017 and 2019, respectively. In 2017 and 2019, the order was valued at approximately $40 million and $46 million, respectively. The known buyers of 155 mm shells have been the United Arab Emirates and Armenia. An unidentified European nation—likely Poland or Slovenia—just bought the artillery munitions, according to reports in February 2024.

Videos from Ukraine have recently surfaced, showing the artillery ammunition manufactured in India being used by Ukrainian forces in the Russo-Ukrainian war. Social media posts in both the Russian and Ukrainian languages reported what seemed to be Indian 155mm artillery shells likely falling into Ukraine. It was rumored that the weaponry consisted of MIL-produced HE ERFB BT shells.

MIL and its partner, Nadrah Company, inked a $225 million deal at World Defense Show 2024 to provide artillery ammunition to Saudi Arabia.

As of March 2024, Munitions India has export orders worth ₹6,000 crore, to be supplied till 2026-27. The leading customers are UAE, Vietnam, and one undisclosed country from Europe. Saudi Arabia had also ordered 155mm shells in 2024.

In 2023 and early 2024, the company exported 500 tonnes of explosives to Germany's Rheinmetall. In October 2023, the company made an initial shipment of 144 tonnes of explosives. Two additional shipments were undertaken, with the final shipment in March 2024.

In FY 2023-24, about Rs. 2,000 crores (i.e. 28.5%) of contracts of MIL contracts were from export orders. The total business value for the same period was of Rs. 7,000 crore.

== See also ==
- Other PSUs formed from the Ordnance Factory Board:-
  - Advanced Weapons and Equipment India Limited (AWE), Kanpur
  - Armoured Vehicles Nigam Limited (AVANI), Chennai
  - Gliders India Limited (GIL), Kanpur
  - India Optel Limited (IOL), Dehradun
  - Troop Comforts Limited (TCL), Kanpur
  - Yantra India Limited (YIL), Nagpur
