= Armoured Vehicles Nigam =

Indian military vehicle manufacturer

Armoured Vehicles Nigam Limited
- Company type: Public Sector Enterprise
- Industry: Defence Production
- Predecessor: Ordnance Factory Board
- Founded: 1 October 2021; 4 years ago
- Headquarters: Heavy Vehicles Factory, Avadi, Chennai, India
- Key people: A N Srivastava, IOFS (Chairman & Managing Director)
- Products: Armoured fighting vehicles; Main battle tanks; Military vehicles; Vehicle parts
- Net income: ₹541.9 million (US$5.7 million)
- Owner: Government of India
- Divisions: Heavy Vehicles Factory, Avadi; Engine Factory, Avadi; Ordnance Factory Medak; Vehicle Factory Jabalpur; Machine Tool Prototype Factory, Ambernath
- Website: avnl.co.in

Armoured Vehicles Nigam Limited (AVANI) (transl. Armoured Vehicles Corporation Limited) is an Indian public sector defence company, headquartered in Avadi, Chennai. It was established in 2021 as part of the restructuring of the Ordnance Factory Board into seven Public Sector Undertakings. It manufactures Armoured fighting vehicles, Main battle tanks, Military vehicles and their engines for the Indian Armed Forces.

== Products and facilities ==
=== AVANI, Chennai ===
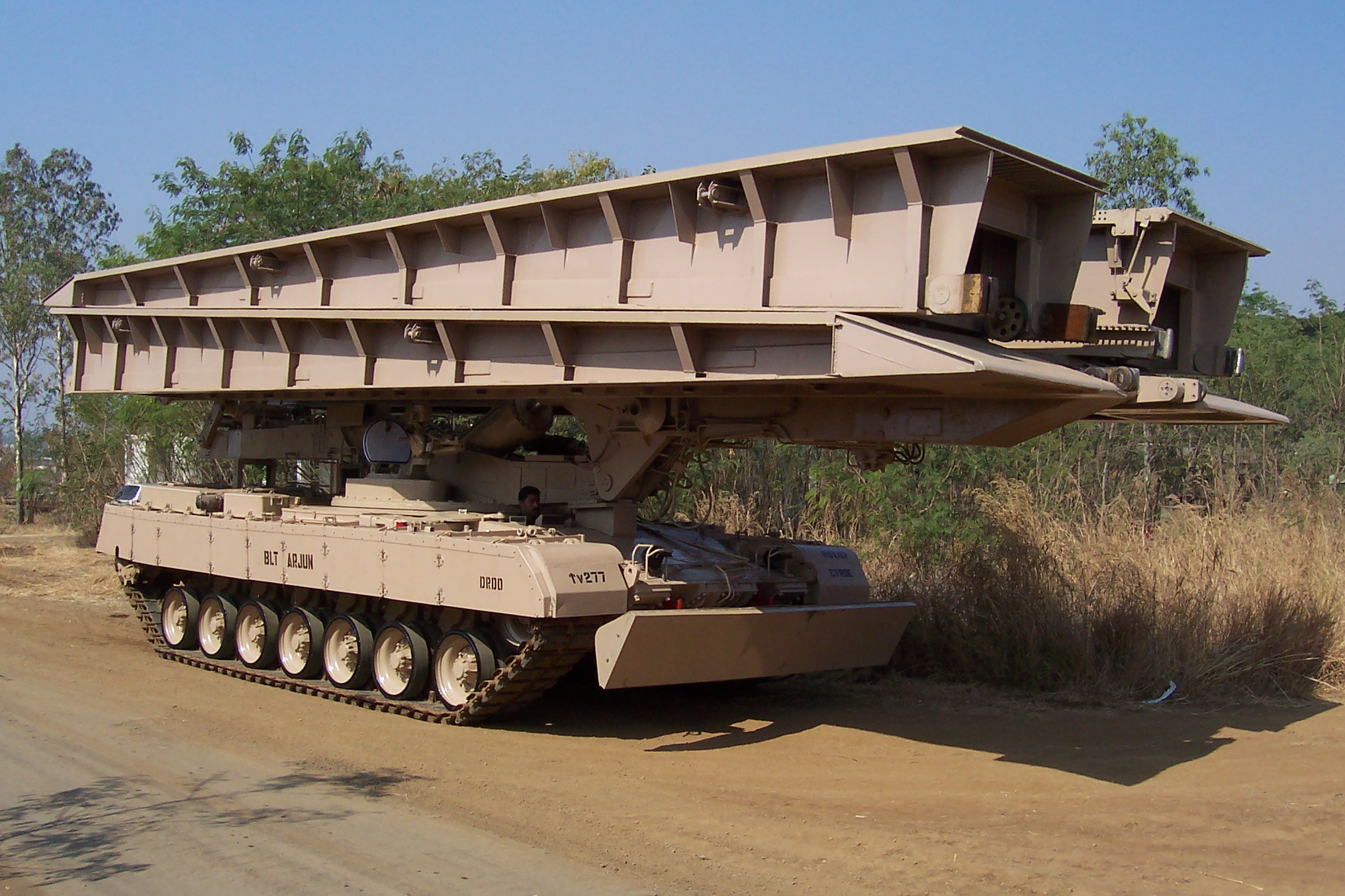
BLT based on Arjun platform

- Arjun MK1: First production variant Arjun tank similar to the Leopard 2A4, entered service with the Indian Army in 2004. It is a 58.5 ton main battle tank equipped with Kanchan composite armour, a 120 mm rifled gun and an indigenous FCS with digital ballistic computer. It has a laser warning receiver based active protection system
- Bhim SPH: A 155 mm self-propelled howitzer variant of the Arjun has been prototyped by fitting the South African Denel T6 turret, which comes with the G5 howitzer to the Arjun chassis. This project has been cancelled as Denel has become embroiled in a corruption scandal in India.
- Arjun Catapult System: A 130 mm Catapult howitzer system based on the Arjun chassis. The trials were concluded successfully, and the Indian Army is expected to place an order for 40 systems.
- Bridge Layer Tank (BLT) based on the Arjun chassis developed by the CVRDE. It uses the "scissors type" of bridge laying method, which does not raise the bridge high up into the air, reducing its visibility to hostile forces.
- Arjun ARRV: Armoured recovery and repair vehicle based on the Arjun chassis developed by CVRDE and BEML, for supporting Arjun tank regiments in battlefield.
- Tank EX: A hybrid experimental tank prototype, coupling a T-72 chassis with an Arjun turret.
- Arjun MK1A: The MK1A (previously designated as MK2) is a new variant of Arjun tank designed to enhance firepower, mobility and survivability. It has a completely redesigned turret protected with improved Kanchan armour and ERA. The MK1A has 89 major and minor improvements, of these 73 could be easily incorporated into the MK1 variant. Other major improvements include the addition of NERA for protection, integration of the gun-launched SAMHO ATGM, integration of the gunner's main sight with the automatic target tracking system, integration of the commander's panoramic sight (CPS MK-II) with the laser rangefinder and dual magnification day sight, the addition of an uncooled thermal sight interfaced with the FCS for hunter-killer capability, the addition of an uncooled sight system with binocular vision for the driver, a remote controlled weapon station, a track width mine plough, a containerized ammunition bin with individual shutter (CABIS) for crew safety, an advanced land navigation system, a new auxiliary power unit with double power generation capacity, and a redesigned hydropneumatic suspension system with new advanced running gear system (ARGS) to enhance agility. The Arjun MK1A has considerably more indigenous content than previous variant.

=== AVANI, Jabalpur ===
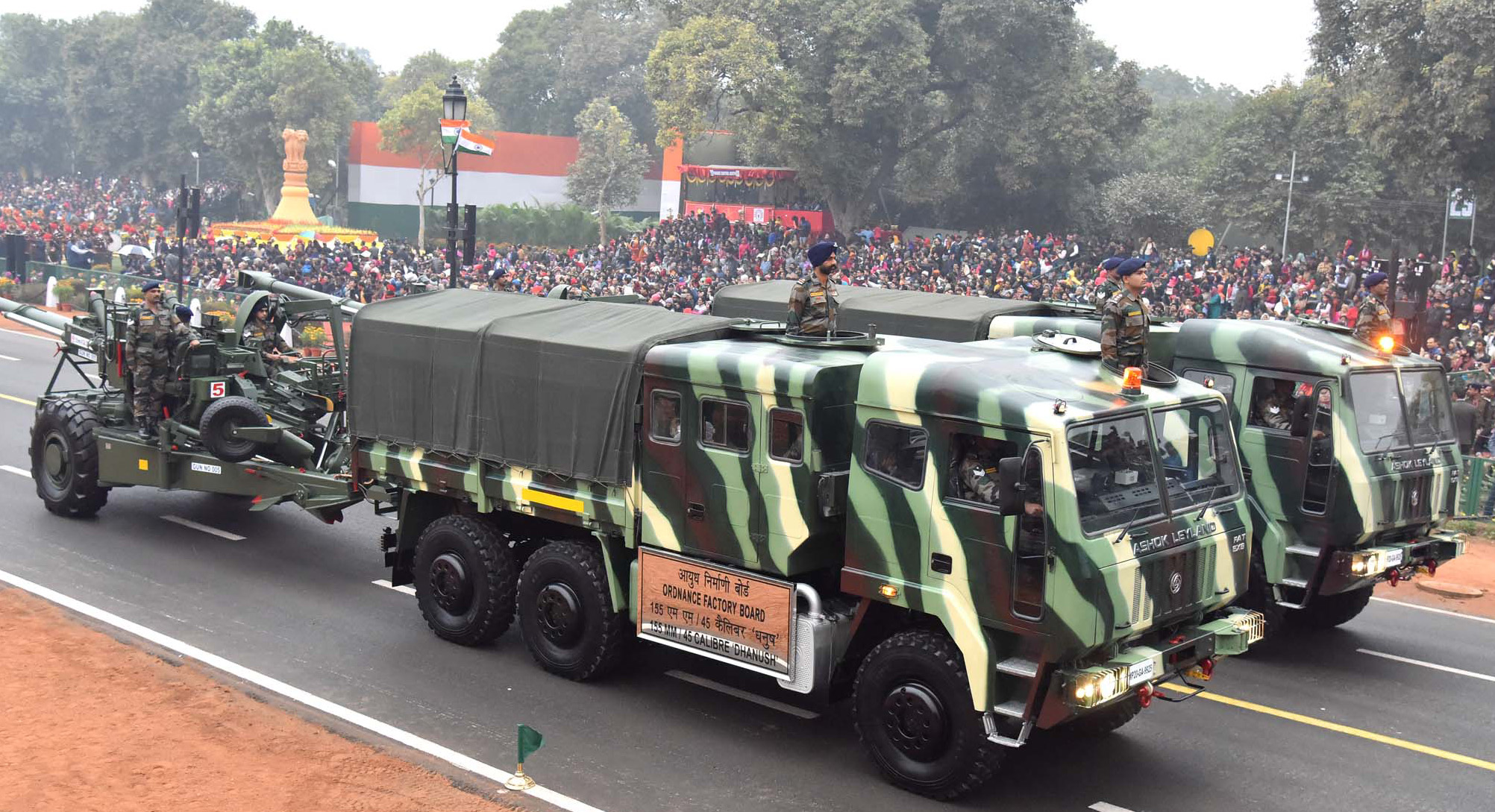
Dhanush howitzer with tractor

- Aditya, Mine Protected Vehicle: This vehicle is designed to provide unmatched protection to the soldiers in the battlefield. The superior blast and ballistic protection coupled with high powered mobility makes this vehicle a true combat armoured vehicle for soldiers.
- Sharang Gun: Sharang is the 130mm artillery gun ‘up-gunned’ to 155mm, 45 calibre up-gunning based on the Army’s tender.The gun’s range has now gone from 27km to over 36km with the upgrade.
- Super Stallion Trucks: Developed with collaboration of Ashok Leyland, The 6x6 Truck is rated at 10 tonnes while the 8x8 is rated at 12 tonnes.

=== AVANI, Medak ===
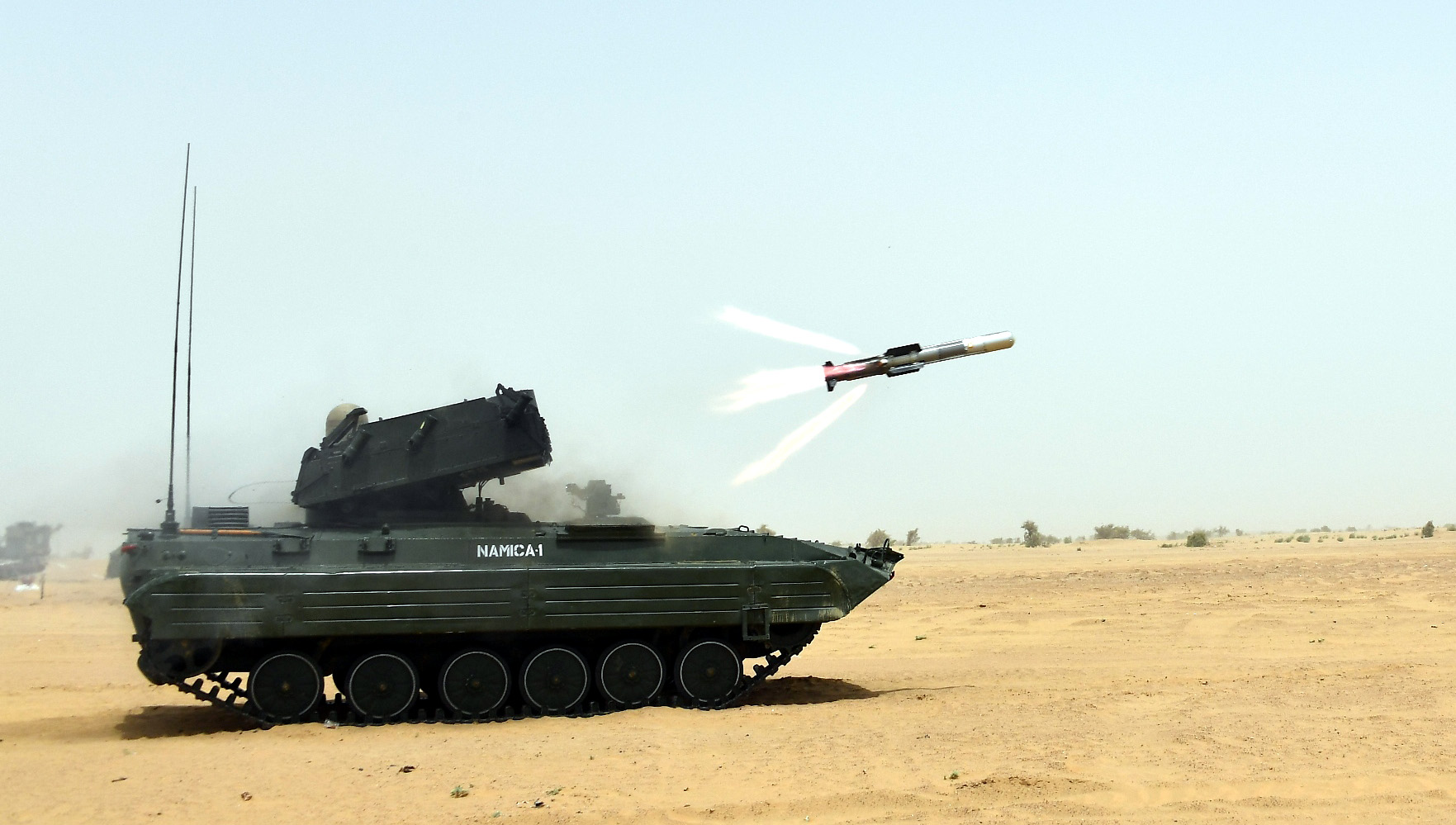
NAMICA armored missile carrier

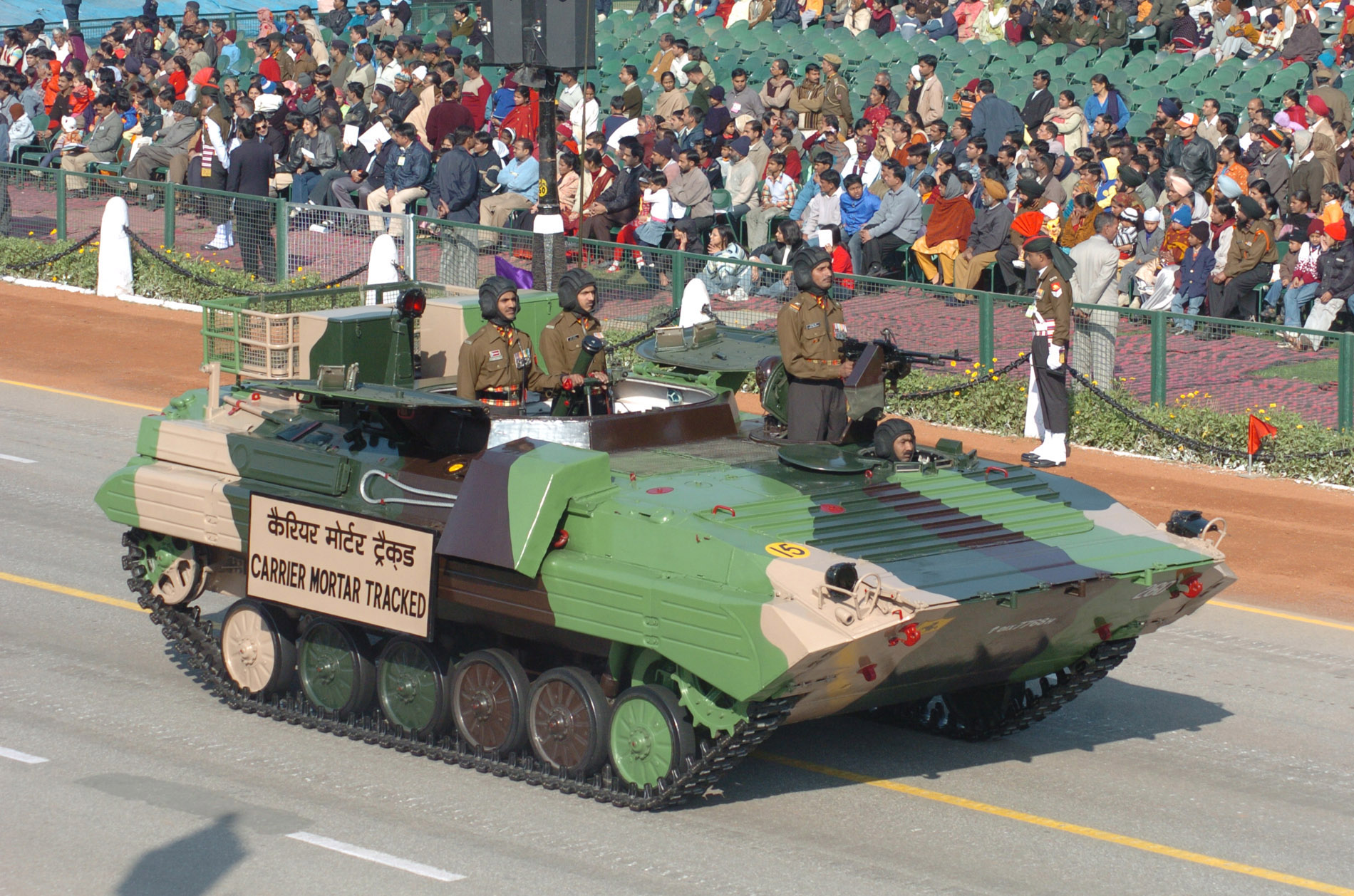
Carrier Mortar Tracked

- Armoured Ambulance Tracked Vehicle (AATV): Armoured Ambulance is equipped to administer emergency medical care to battle casualties .It has in-built medical facilities.
- Armoured Engineering Reconnaissance Vehicle (AERV): The AERV is designed to conduct topographic and river bed surveys to facilitate the construction of assault bridges across water obstacles.
- Carrier Mortar Tracked: CMT Vehicle is based on BMP-II Chassis. This turretless version has 81mm mortar mounted on the modified troop compartment. The mortar is fired through an opening in the hull roof that has two hinged doors. The stowage capacity is 108 rounds.
- Closed Range Naval Gun(CRN-91): CRN 91 gun is a flexible and effective weapon intended for use against armored target and air target flying at low altitudes. The range is 2 km for Armour-piercing tracer projectile and 4 km for HE projectiles.
- NAMICA: NAMICA (Nag Missile Carrier) is a stretched, license-built BMP-2 with additional wheels with Prospina missile system. It is classified as a tank destroyer. It is equipped with various electro-optical systems including a thermal imager (TI) and a laser rangefinder (LRF) for target acquisition.

== See also ==
- Advanced Weapons and Equipment India Limited
- Combat Vehicles Research and Development Establishment
- Gliders India Limited
- India Optel Limited
- Munitions India Limited
- Troop Comforts Limited
- Yantra India Limited
