= Gliders India =

Indian parachute manufacturer

Gliders India Limited
- Company type: Public Sector Undertaking
- Industry: Defence Production
- Predecessor: Ordnance Factory Board
- Founded: 1 October 2021
- Headquarters: Kanpur, India
- Key people: M. C Balasubramaniam, IOFS (Chairman & Managing Director); Sunil Date, IOFS (Director Operations & HR); Surendra Dhapodkar, IOFS (Director Finance)
- Products: Military, cargo, aero-sport and special purpose parachutes and rubber products
- Owner: Government of India
- Divisions: Ordnance Parachute Factory
- Website: glidersindia.in

Gliders India Limited (GIL) is an Indian state-owned defence company, headquartered at Ordnance Parachute Factory in Kanpur, India established in 2021 as part of the restructuring and corporatisation of the Ordnance Factory Board into seven different Public Sector Undertakings. GIL primarily manufactures military parachutes for the use of the Indian Armed Forces and foreign militaries and parachutes for aero-sport and emergency services.

GIL's main manufacturing facility is the Ordnance Parachute Factory in Kanpur.

== See also ==
- Other PSUs formed from Ordnance Factory Board:-
  - Advanced Weapons and Equipment India Limited (AWE), Kanpur
  - Armoured Vehicles Nigam Limited (AVANI), Chennai
  - India Optel Limited (IOL), Dehradun
  - Munitions India Limited (MIL), Pune
  - Troop Comforts Limited (TCL), Kanpur
  - Yantra India Limited (YIL), Nagpur
