= India Optel =

Indian weapons production company

India Optel Limited
- Type: Public Sector Undertaking
- Industry: Defence Production
- Predecessor: Ordnance Factory Board
- Founded: 1 October 2021; 4 years ago
- Headquarters: OFIL Campus, Dehradun, India
- Key people: Smt. Sharmishtha Koul Sharma, Director (HR) & Additional Charge, CMD
- Products: Electro-optical sensors; Weapon sights; Communication equipments
- Revenue: Rs.2010 Cr. FY-2025-26
- Owner: Government of India
- Divisions: Opto-Electronics Factory, Dehradun; Ordnance Factory, Chandigarh; Ordnance Factory, Dehradun
- Website: indiaoptel.in

India Optel Limited is an Indian state-owned defence company, headquartered in Dehradun, India established in 2021 as part of the restructuring and corporatization of the Ordnance Factory Board into seven different Public Sector Undertakings. India Optel primarily manufactures electro-optical sensors, weapon sights and communication equipment for the use of the Indian Armed Forces and foreign militaries.

India Optel Limited consists of the following three factories of the erstwhile Ordnance Factory Board:

- Opto-Electronics Factory, Dehradun
- Ordnance Factory, Chandigarh
- Ordnance Factory, Dehradun

== Collaboration ==
In order to transfer production of the SIGMA 30N Digital Ring Laser Gyro Inertial Navigation System, which is used in artillery guns, air defense systems, missiles, and radars, as well as the CM3-MR Direct Firing Sight, which is intended for artillery guns and anti-drone systems, India Optel Limited and Safran Electronics & Defense signed a collaboration agreement on December 22, 2025. In order to guarantee that the systems satisfy the operational requirements of the Indian Army, IOL will be in charge of production, final assembly, testing, quality control, and complete life-cycle support.

== See also ==
- Other PSUs formed from Ordnance Factory Board:-
  - Advanced Weapons and Equipment India Limited (AWE), Kanpur
  - Armoured Vehicles Nigam Limited (AVANI), Chennai
  - Gliders India Limited (GIL), Kanpur
  - Munitions India Limited (MIL), Pune
  - Troop Comforts Limited (TCL), Kanpur
  - Yantra India Limited (YIL), Nagpur
