= Ordnance Factory Muradnagar =

Indian defence company

Ordnance Factory Muradnagar (OFM)
- Company type: Government
- Founded: Muradnagar, India (1943)
- Products: Forgings and castings for munitions
- Owner: Yantra India Limited
- Number of employees: ~2000
- Parent: Yantra India Limited (current); Ordnance Factories Board (former)
- Website: www.ofm.gov.in

Ordnance Factory Muradnagar (आयुध निर्माणी मुरादनगर ) operated Yantra India Limited was a unit of the Ordnance Factory Board and is a premium steel casting unit of OFB. It specializes in alloy and steel castings - armoured as well as non-armoured, ammunition hardware, grey iron castings for ammunition hardware and moulds and open die steel forgings for Hot die steel and other tool steel. It supplies castings for aerial bombs, track assembly for T-90 tanks, 81mm bomb bodies and general castings required for tanks, 155mm field guns etc. to sister factories.

== Certification ==
QMS IS-ISO 9001-2015

EOHS IS-ISO 14001-2004

OHASAS IS-18001-2007

NABL ISO-IEC 17025-2005

== Demographics ==
As of 2011 India census, Ordnance Factory Muradnagar is a Census Town city in district of Ghaziabad, Uttar Pradesh. The Ordnance Factory Muradnagar Census Town has population of 7,569 of which 4,029 are males while 3,540 are females as per report released by Census India 2011.

The population of children aged 0-6 is 836 which is 11.05% of total population of Ordnance Factory Muradnagar (CT). In Ordnance Factory Muradnagar Census Town, the female sex ratio is 879 against state average of 912. Moreover, the child sex ratio in Ordnance Factory Muradnagar is around 779 compared to Uttar Pradesh state average of 902. The literacy rate of Ordnance Factory Muradnagar city is 89.69% higher than the state average of 67.68%. In Ordnance Factory Muradnagar, male literacy is around 94.75% while the female literacy rate is 84.03%.

Ordnance Factory Muradnagar Census Town has total administration over 1,564 houses to which it supplies basic amenities like water and sewerage. It is also authorize to build roads within Census Town limits and impose taxes on properties coming under its jurisdiction.

== O.F. Estate, Muradnagar ==
OFM is located in Muradnagar town, Ghaziabad district on Delhi – Meerut NH-58 and is 40 km from New Delhi Railway Station, Muradnagar Railway station is 100 meters from the Main Gate of the factory. The nearest Civil airport, Indira Gandhi International Airport, Delhi is about 60 km from the factory. This is the residential area for the families of Ordnance Factory employees. The Ordnance Factory Estate is lush green, clean and has a pollution-free environment. The estate has modern amenities, 24-hour electricity & water supply, and emergency medical services at the Ordnance Factory Hospital. There are 7 schools in the estate including one Kendriya Vidyalaya to provide education to the wards of the employees.

The cricketer Suresh Raina, who is currently in the squad of the Indian Cricket Team was born and brought up on the Ordnance Factory estate, where his family stays.

A water pipeline runs through this town and goes on to Delhi and NCR areas.

== History ==
Ordnance Factory Muradnagar (OFM) is one of the metallurgical factories in the family of Ordnance Factories (M&C Group). It came into existence on 01.03.1943 as a transplantation project during the second world war. Since then, the factory has been stagnant for years after years and not adopting itself quickly to the changing needs of the services. Factory still produces Aerial Bombs that are technologically 70 years old and require a plane fly directly above the target to drop accurately.

== Near By Place ==
Famous Lower Ganga Canal having 634 km length running from Har-ki-Pouri in Hardwar to Kanpur flows on the eastern side of the estate and the factory. By the side of the Ganga Canal, about 3 km from the Factory Estate, there is a "Mussoori fall" which is a local Picnic Spot. An Atta Chakki run by water, dating back to British period is a place of attraction for visitors. With vast expanse of greenery, abundant blooming of roses and free movement of peacocks, Muradnagar offers a landscape of serene beauty and unpolluted environment without any hustle of so-called Modern industrial city life.

== OFM Products ==
OFM is a premium Steel casting unit of OFB Ordnance Factory Board. It specializes in alloy and steel castings - armoured as well as non-armoured, ammunition hardware, grey iron castings for ammunition hardware and moulds and open die steel forgings for Hot die steel and other tool steel. It supplies castings for aerial bombs, track assembly for T-90 tank, 81mm bomb bodies and general castings required for tanks, 155mm field gun etc. to sister factories.

MAIN PRODUCTS

AERIAL BOMBS

- 1000 lbs
- 450 kg HSLD
- 250 kg HSLD

TRACK LINK ASSEMBLY T90

AMMUNITION HARDWARE (STEEL)

- 81 mm PWP Mortar Bomb Bodies
- 81 mm HE Bomb Bodies
- 125 mm HEAT Head

AMMUNITION HARDWARE (GREY IRON)

- Hand Grenade Bodies
- FT Wire
- 25 lbs bomb bodies

FORGING PRODUCTS

- Hot Die Tool Steel and other tool steel Forgings of different grades
- H-10
- H-11
- H-13
- EN-24
- EN-8
- EN-9

MISCELLANEOUS CASTINGS

ARMOURED STEEL CASTINGS produced for MBT Arjun Tank, T-72 & T-90 Tanks. A variety of castings with minimum weight of 1.25 kg to a maximum weight of 1130 kg are produced at OFM.

NON ARMOURED STEEL CASTINGS for various guns, mortars and their mountings. These castings are produced out of alloy steels with nickel and molybdenum as important alloying elements.

MISCELLANEOUS PRODUCTS

Cast Iron mould for castings of brass ingots, steel ingots, other steel melting shop accessories like slag moulds, hot top castings etc.

Various types of Products
