= Yantra India =

Indian weapons production company

Yantra India Limited
- Native name: A Miniratna Category I Defence Public Sector Unit
- Type: Public Sector Undertaking
- Industry: Defence Hardware Production
- Predecessor: Ordnance Factory Board
- Founded: 1 October 2021
- Headquarters: Ordnance Factory Ambajhari Estate, Nagpur Maharashtra, India
- Key people: Shri Vijaykumar Iyer (Chairman & Managing Director) & (Director Operations) Shri Rajeev Kalra (Director Finance); Shri S K Singh (Director HR)
- Products: forgings, castings, metal and steel components, Ammunition Hardware, Pinaka Rocket and its Pod, Gun Barrels, Tank Components, Copper and Aluminium Alloy Components, Aerospace Aircraft Components, Ammunition Packing Boxes
- Owner: Government of India Ministry Of Defence
- Divisions: Ordnance Factory Ambajhari; Ordnance Factory Ambarnath; Ordnance Factory Bhusawal; Ordnance Factory Dum Dum; Ordnance Factory Katni; Ordnance Factory Muradnagar; Metal And Steel Factory Ishapore; Ordnance Factory Jabalpur
- Website: yantraindia.co.in

Yantra India Limited is a major Indian public sector defence company, headquartered in Nagpur, India. Established in 2021 as part of the government's restructuring and corporatisation of the Ordnance Factory Board into seven different Public Sector Undertakings – the company consists of eight defence manufacturing factory units indigenously catering to the needs of supplies, arms, explosives, artillery and munition for the Indian Armed Forces.

== Divisions ==
Yantra India consists of the following seven factories of the erstwhile Ordnance Factory Board:

- Ordnance Factory Ambajhari
- Ordnance Factory Ambarnath
- Ordnance Factory Bhusawal
- Ordnance Factory Dum Dum
- Ordnance Factory Katni
- Ordnance Factory Muradnagar
- Metal And Steel Factory Ishapore
- Grey Iron Foundry Jabalpur

== Product ==
- Pinaka multi-barrel rocket launcher.

== See also ==
- Other PSUs formed from Ordnance Factory Board:
  - Advanced Weapons and Equipment India Limited (AWE), Kanpur
  - Armoured Vehicles Nigam Limited (AVANI), Chennai
  - Gliders India Limited (GIL), Kanpur
  - India Optel Limited (IOL), Dehradun
  - Munitions India Limited (MIL), Pune
  - Troop Comforts Limited (TCL), Kanpur
