= List of equipment of the Indian Army =

The below is a list of present equipment used by the Indian Army and the Indian Army's future equipment procurement.

== Vehicles ==
=== Armoured combat vehicles ===
Name	Image	Type	Quantity	Origin	Notes
Tanks
Arjun Mk 1 Arjun Mk 1A		Main battle tank	124 (Mk 1) 2 (Mk 1A)	India	Status: In service. 5 Mk 1A to be inducted in 2024. 118 Mk 1A on order
T-90S Bhishma T-90S Bhishma Mk 2 T-90 Bhishma Mk 3		Main battle tank	1300 (T-90S) 10 (Mk 3)	Russia; India	Status: In service. Initial orders were a combination of Russian-made and locally assembled units before being licence-produced by Heavy Vehicles Factory. T-90S being upgraded to T-90MS standard. 464 Mk 3 ordered in 2019. 10 delivered as of 2024.
T-72M1 Ajeya T-72 Ajeya Mk 2 T-72 Combat Improved Ajeya		Main battle tank	2,418	Soviet Union; India	Status: In service. To be replaced by Future Ready Combat Vehicle and Future Main Battle Tank programmes.: 968 T72M1 upgraded by HVF. 1400 T-72M1 fitted with ERA MK1 armour being upgraded to ERA Mk 2. standard. Further 1,000 tanks will be upgraded with new engines, fire control system & other modern systems.
Zorawar		Light tank	59 (on order)	India	Status: On order. 295 more planned.
Infantry fighting vehicles
BMP-2 Sarath		Tracked infantry fighting vehicle	2,400	India; Soviet Union	Status: In service. All BMP-2/2K vehicles are to be upgraded to BMP-2M standard. Manufactured locally in India by Ordnance Factory Medak. In March 2024, MoD signed an initial contract with AVNL to upgrade 693 units to BMP-2M configuration. Additional 156 units on order.
Tata Kestrel		Wheeled infantry fighting vehicle	15	India	Status: In service. 9 on order with additional 105 planned.
Tank destroyer
NAMICA		Tracked tank destroyer		India	Status: On order. 13 units ordered on 27 March 2025.
Miscellaneous tracked vehicles
NBC Reconnaissance Vehicle		CRBN reconnaissance vehicle	16	India	Status: In service. BMP-2 based CRBN developed by CVRDE and produced by Ordnance Factory Medak.
Carrier Mortar Tracked		Mortar carrier	220	India	Status: In service. BMP-2 based mortar carrier. Developed by CVRDE and manufactured by Ordnance Factory Medak.
DRDO Armoured Ambulance		Armoured ambulance	275	India	Status: In service. BMP-2 based armoured ambulance developed by CVRDE and produced by Ordnance Factory Medak, 288 ordered.
Armoured personnel carriers
Kalyani M4		Infantry mobility vehicle (Heavy)	126	India	Status: In Service. Additional units were ordered for the deployment along the LAC. To be equipped with Spike anti-tank guided missile and 20 mm automatic turret.
Quick Reaction Fighting Vehicle		Infantry mobility vehicle (Medium)	36	India	Status: In service. First batch of Quick Reaction Fighting Vehicle inducted.
Straton Plus		Infantry mobility vehicle (Medium)	N/A	India	Status: In service. Used by UN Peace keeping force.
Casspir		Infantry mobility vehicle (Medium)	200	South Africa	Status: In service.
OFB Aditya		Infantry mobility vehicle (Medium)	1,600	India	Status: In service. Based on Casspir. Manufactured at Ordnance Factory Medak and Vehicle Factory Jabalpur.
Mahindra Armado		Military light utility vehicle	1,300	India	Status: In Service. Also known as Armored Light Specialist Vehicle (ALSV).
Mahindra Airawat		Military light utility vehicle (Mortar carrier)	50	India	Status: In Service. Also known as Vehicle Mounted Infantry Mortar System (VMIMS).
Mahindra Marksman		Military light utility vehicle	N/A	India	Status: In service. Mainly used for anti-terror operations in Kashmir region.
Mahindra Rakshak		Military light utility vehicle	1,000	India	Status: In service (Phasing out). All units will be replaced by Mahindra ALSV until 2024. Bulletproof vehicle with composite armour which offers protection against 7.62 mm bullets.
Renault Sherpa	Festival automobile international 2012 - Renault Sherpa light Scout - 006	Military light utility vehicle	14	France	Status: In service.
DRDO Prahaar 510		Armoured personnel carrier	Unknown	India	Status: In service.

=== Utility and staff transport ===
Name	Image	Type	Quantity	Origin	Notes
Force Gurkha 4×4 (Dhwansak)		Light utility vehicle		India	Status: In Service, was ordered in 2018. Further 2,978 units of Light Strike Vehicle (LSV) variant ordered on 27 March 2025. To be used by the Indian Air Force also. Payload: 800 kg; Soft Top model.
Tata Safari Storme		Light utility vehicle	1,300	India	Status:In Service. 3193 units ordered in May 2017. GS800 category. To replace Maruti Suzuki Gypsy.
Tata Xenon		Light utility vehicle		India	Status: In service.
Royal Enfield Bullet		Light 2-person transport vehicle		India	Status: In service.
Tata Sumo		Light utility vehicle		India	Status: In service.
Toyota Hilux		Light utility vehicle		JapanIndia	Status: In Service with Northern Command.
Mahindra Scorpio		Light utility vehicle	3300	India	Status: Armored version in service.
Mahindra Scorpio Pik-up		Pickup truck		India	Status: On order. 1,986 units ordered on 27 May 2025. Payload: 800 kg.
Mahindra 550		Light utility vehicle		India	Status: In service. Used as troop carrier
Maruti Suzuki Gypsy		Light utility vehicle	35000	India; Japan	Status: In service. Additional 541 ordered in July 2020.
Toyota Fortuner		Light utility vehicle		India; Japan	Status: In Service. Army Signals Corps. fitted with telecommunication devices.
Mitsubishi Pajero		Staff transport		Japan	Status: In service. Deployed at the Indo-Chinese Border.
Ashok Leyland Short Chassis 4×2		Minibus		India	Status: Ordered. 500 pre-fragmented short chassis, worth ₹197.35 crore (equivalent to ₹204 crore or US$22 million in 2026), ordered on 18 March 2025.
Polaris Sportsman 6x6 ATV		All-terrain vehicle		India United States	Status: In service. Used on Indo-Tibetian border
Polaris Ranger		All-terrain vehicle		India United States	Status: In service. Used on Indo-Tibetian border
Polaris MRZR		All-terrain vehicle		United States	Status: In service. Multi-purpose all-terrain vehicle. In service with Indian Army Northern Command.
Arctic Cat Alterra TBX 700		All-terrain vehicle		United States	Status: In service. Used by PARA SF
JSW Kapidhwaj		All-terrain vehicle	96	India	Status: In service. Also known as ATOR N1200 Specialist Mobility Vehicle (SMV), an Indianised variant of SHERP N1200.
BsV10 Sindhu		All-terrain vehicle		United KingdomIndia	Status: On order. Local production by Larsen & Toubro.

=== Field transport vehicles ===
Name	Image	Type	Quantity	Origin	Notes
Ashok Leyland 4×4 Ambulance		4×4 Ambulance	825	India	Ordered in 2016.
Ashok Leyland 4x4 Refueling Tanker		4x4 Refueling Tanker			
Tata LPTA 713 TC		Light 4×4 truck	15,000+	India	2.5 ton payload truck. Manufactured by Vehicle Factory Jabalpur.
Tata LPTA 2038 HMV		Medium 6×6 high mobility truck	1,239+	India	Additional 619 units on order. To augment and replace older BEML Tatra 6×6 fleet.
Ashok Leyland Stallion		Medium/heavy 6×6; 8×8; 10×10 truck	70,000+	India	10, 12 and 15 Ton trucks. Manufactured under licence by Vehicle Factory Jabalpur.
BEML Tatra		Medium/heavy 6×6; 8×8; 10×10; 12×12 truck	10,000+	India; Czechoslovakia	Tatra Force heavy trucks licence produced by BEML. Used as chassis for equipment like Radars and Pinaka (T813, T815 8×8) and Smerch MBRL systems (T816 10×10). Its entire 6×6 fleet will be replaced by Tata LPTA 2038 HMV.
Ashok Leyland Topchi		Light 4×4 Artillery tractor		India	3 ton payload truck. Order placed in July 2023.
Ashok Leyland FAT 6×6 [or Gun Towing Vehicle 6×6 (GTV)		Medium 6×6 Artillery tractor	450+	India	Ordered in March 2016 (450) with follow on order in July 2023. To replace Scania SBA111.
Scania SBA111		Medium 6×6 Artillery tractor	660	Sweden	Used for towing Bofors FH77B howitzers. To be replaced by Ashok Leyland FAT 6×6.
KrAZ-255		Medium 6×6 Artillery tractor	N/A	USSR	Used for towing 130 mm M-46 guns.

=== Engineering and support vehicles ===
Name	Image	Type	Quantity	Origin	Notes
WZT-3M		Armoured recovery vehicle	352	Poland; India	204 on order. Initial orders were of Polish-made units before being licence-produced by Bharat Earth Movers Limited.
VT-72B		Armoured recovery vehicle		USSR	Based on T-72. Being overhauled.
Armoured Vehicle Tracked Light Repair (AVLTR)		Armoured recovery vehicle		India	Based on BMP-2 with turret removed and bulldozer blade and other engineering equipment added. Being manufactured at Ordnance Factory Medak.
Armoured Engineer Reconnaissance Vehicle		Military engineering vehicle	16	India	Status: In service. 53 on order. BMP-2 based engineering and reconnaissance vehicle (Armoured Engineer Reconnaissance Vehicle) being manufactured at Ordnance Factory Medak.
Mechanical Minefield Marking Equipment Mk-II		Mine Detection Vehicle		India	Status: In service since August 2025. Developed by DRDO's R&DE(E), manufactured by BEML and deployed by the Corps of Engineers.
Hydrema		Mine clearing vehicle	24	Denmark	Status: In service.
Bridge Laying Tank T-72		Armoured Vehicle Launched Bridge		India; USSR	Status: On order. 47 ordered for ₹1,561 crore (equivalent to ₹16 billion or US$170 million in 2026) on 21 Jan 2025. T-72 M1 tank variant integrated with long Military Load Classification 70 bridge, can be used to cross canal/stream/river by all tracked & wheeled vehicles in service with the Army.
Pontoonova Mostova Subravia (PMS)		Pontoon bridge		India; USSR	Status: In Service
Arjun BLT		Armoured Vehicle Launched Bridge		India	BLT Arjun is a fast and reliable bridge laying system built on the Main Battle Tank Arjun, it is capable of launching a 24 m bridge with in 10 minutes on any wet and dry obstacles, facilitating speedy induction.
Kartik BLT		Armoured Vehicle Launched Bridge		India	The Kartik BLT is a variant of the Vijayanta with a 20 m bridge of Military Load Classification Class 60 and is meant to move vehicle
DRDO Sarvatra		Truck-mounted, multi-span, mobile bridging system	50	India	8×8 truck-mounted bridging system
L&T Modular Bridge		Truck-mounted, single-span, mobile bridging system	1	India	Status: In Service. 41 sets on order. Developed and designed by DRDO. Manufactured by L&T. 46 m mobile bridging system. Each sets consists of "7 carrier vehicles based on 8×8 HMVs and 2 launcher vehicles based on 10×10 HMVs.
Axiscades Tank Transporter Trailer		Tank transporter		India	Status: On order. An order for 212 units placed with Axiscades Aerospace and Technologies Pvt Ltd on August 1, 2025 at a cost of ₹223.95 crore. It can carry 50-ton tanks and other armoured vehicles and is equipped with hydraulic & pneumatic loading ramps, steerable and liftable axles.
CL 70 Mat Ground Surfacing		Truck-mounted mat ground surfacing		India	Mounted on Tatra vehicle with automated laying and recovery has been developed for providing mobility in sandy and marshy terrain.

=== Unmanned ground vehicles ===
Name	Image	Type	Quantity	Origin	Notes
THeMIS		Unmanned ground vehicle		Estonia	Status: In service. Used as a reconnaissance vehicle.
DRDO Daksh		Bomb disposal robot	250	India	Status: In service. Used in sensitive missions including bombs and mines.
Vision-60 robotic MULE		Unmanned ground vehicle	100	United States	Status: In service. Made in India by AeroArc and Ghost Robotics in joint venture with ToT.
Krushna		Unmanned ground vehicle		India	Status: In service. Purchased from Jaipur-based Club First Robotics. Use for combat fire support and carries a Konkurs (ATGM).
All Terrain Tactical Haulers (ATT Haulers)		Unmanned ground vehicle	300	Israel	Status: In service. Made in India by TVS Sundaram and Marom Dolphin joint venture with ToT.

== Howitzers and field guns ==
Name	Image	Type	Quantity	Origin	Notes
Tracked self-propelled howitzers
K9 Vajra-T		Self-propelled howitzer 155 mm L/52	100	Republic of Korea; India	Status: In service.: 1st batch of 100 units ordered in 2016. Delivered by 2021.; 2nd batch for 100 units ordered in December 2024.; Additional 335 units approved for procurement.; Ordered from South Korea's Hanwha Defense and assembled by India's Larsen & Toubro.
Towed howitzers
BAE Systems M777		Ultra-lightweight howitzer 155 mm L/39	145	United Kingdom; India	Status: In service. Total 145 ordered. Assembled in India by Mahindra Defense
Amogh		Towed howitzer 155 mm L/52		India	Status: 307 guns on order.
Dhanush		Towed howitzer 155 mm L/45	>36	India	Status: In service. 114 guns on order. Order may increase to 414.
Haubits FH77 B02		Towed howitzer 155 mm L/45	~300	Sweden	Status: In service. To be replaced by end of 2025 with OFB Dhanush howitzer. Gun made by Bofors. 410 howitzers acquired from 1986 to 1991, roughly 300 remain in service.
D-30		Towed howitzer 122 mm L/38	520	Soviet Union	Status: In service.
M-46 Soltam		Towed howitzer 155 mm L/45	180	Soviet UnionIsrael	Status: in service. 180 units upgraded to 155 mm standard by Soltam. Upgunned 130 mm M-46
IOB Sharang		Towed howitzer 155 mm L/45	159	Soviet UnionIndia	Status: In service. 300 on order Upgunned 130 mm M-46. Further induction halted in Sept 25 after defects were found.
Field guns
OFB Indian Field Gun Mk 1/2/3		Field gun 105 mm L/22	2,400	India	Status: In service.
M-46	M-46 Lutsk	Field gun 130 mm L/55	<1,000	India; Soviet Union	Status: in service. 180 upgraded to 155 mm standard by Soltam in 2008. 300 M-46 guns being upgraded by OFB to 155 mm/45 calibre "Sharang" guns.
Static artillery
Vijayanta MBT		105 mm Gun turret fortification	200	India; United Kingdom	Status: In service. 105 mm Gun, used as static defence on LOC.
T-55 MBT		105 mm Gun turret fortification	Up to 700	India; Soviet Union	Status: In service. 105 mm Gun, used as static defence on LOC.
Future procurements or currently under trials
—	IFG Mk2 SPH prototype	Wheeled self-propelled howitzer 105 mm L/37	200	India	RFP in November 2023 Potential guns: IFG Mk2 SPH (6×6 truck); Garuda 105 (4×4 truck); Garuda 105 V2 (4×4 AFV)
Towed Gun System (TGS)	—	Towed howitzer 155 mm L/52	1st order: 400 Total: 1200	India	Future mainstay gun of the Indian Army artillery. Procurement of 400 guns cleared by Ministry of Defence. Tender for 400 guns and towing vehicles issued.
Mounted Gun System (MGS)	Dhanush prototype	Wheeled self-propelled howitzer 155 mm L/52	814	India	Prototypes based on the Dhanush, the ATAGS exist. Foreign proposals based on the CAESAr, the ATMOS 2000, Archer.

== Rocket artillery ==
Name	Image	Calibre	Quantity	Origin	Notes
Multiple rocket launchers
Agnibaan		122 mm	150 launchers	Soviet Union; India	Status: In service. Indian upgraded version of the Soviet BM-21 Grad. Upgraded locally and firing range extended up to 40 km by DRDO. 5 regiments active as of 2024.
Pinaka MBRL		214 mm 300 mm	126+ launchers(as of 2026)	India	Status: In service. Mark 1: 37–45 km range; Guided: 75–80 km range. As of 2014, about 5,000 missiles are being produced every year. 7 regiments active as of March 2026. 3 more Pinaka regiments on order to be produced by L&T and TASL. Army had a plan for 22 regiments by 2028.
Smerch 9K58 MBRL		300 mm	42 launchers	India; Russia	Status: In service. Maximum range: 90 km. 3 regiments active as of 2024 (14 launchers each). A regiment has 3 batteries (4 launchers) and 2 reserved launchers.
Suryastra		306 mm 370 mm	2 launchers	India; Israel	Status: Live fire trials. Maximum range: 150 km and 300 km.

== Air defence systems ==
=== Surface-to-air missiles ===
Name	Image	Type	Quantity	Origin	Notes
Abhra (MR-SAM)		Medium-range surface-to-air missile	5 regiments (40 launchers)	India; Israel	Status: In service. MR-SAM is a medium range air defence system with a max range of 70–80 km. It is used to counter aerial threats such as Fighter aircraft, helicopter, UAV etc.
Akash		Medium-range surface-to-air missile	2 regiments (48 launchers)	India	Status: In service. Akash 1S has 40 km operational range and flight ceiling of 20 km. 2 regiments of Akash Prime on order for Army. Akash-NG with increased range of 70–80 km being tested.
Anant Shastra (QRSAM)		Short-range surface-to-air missile	5-6 regiments	India	Status: In service. Used in limited numbers.
9K33 Osa (SA-8 Gecko)		Surface-to-air missile system	80	USSR	Status: In service (Phasing out). To be replaced by QRSAM.
S-125 (SA-3 Goa)		Surface-to-air missile	25 Squadrons for IAF	USSR	Status: In service (Phasing out). To be replaced by Akash. Used for point-defense of airbases.
Kub (SA-6 Gainful)		Surface-to-air missile	180	Soviet Union	Status: In service (Phasing out) To be replaced by Akash. Used by 501 and 502 AD Group of Army as of 2012
9K35 Strela-10 (SA-13 Gopher)		Surface-to-air missile	200 (as of 2012)	Soviet Union	Status: In service Currently under upgradation with indigenous EO systems and the 9M333 missiles.

=== Anti-aircraft guns ===
Name	Image	Type	Quantity	Origin	Notes
Self-propelled anti-aircraft guns
ZSU-23-4M Shilka		Self-propelled anti-aircraft weapon	75	Soviet Union; India	Status: In service. Upgraded by Bharat Electronics Limited with AESA Fire Control Radar. 75 in service as of 2024.
2K22 Tunguska		Self-propelled anti-aircraft weapon (SAMs)	80	Russia	Status: In service. 2S6M variant in service with Corps of Army Air Defence.
Towed anti-aircraft guns
ZU-23-2		Anti-aircraft gun	320	Soviet Union India	Status: In service. Upgraded locally with electro-optical fire control system for detecting, tracking and engaging targets with precision.
Bofors L/70 Bofors L/70 Upgraded		Anti-aircraft gun	~1720 200	Sweden; India	Status: In service. Bought in the 1960s from Sweden. To be upgraded by Bharat Electronics Limited. Status: In service. Older L-70 system upgraded by Bharat Electronics Limited. Also used as anti drone system by integrating it with Zen Anti-Drone System.
Bofors L/60		Anti-aircraft gun	Unknown	Sweden	Status: In service (To be replaced by Sudarshan CIWS).
Future procurements or currently under trials
AK-630		C-RAM	6	Russia; India	Status: Indian Army Air Defence has floated an RFP (Request for Proposal) for the procurement of six AK-630 Air Defence Gun Systems with AWEIL.
Carrier Air Defence Tracked (CADET)		Self-propelled anti-aircraft weapon (SAMs)	90+	India	Status: Tender (RFI) issued in 2024. Track-based (4 crew) platform with high power-to-weight ratio. To be integrated with Akashteer Control & Reporting system and surface-to-air missiles or anti-aircraft guns or both. To be deployed on various terrains along with mechanised columns. The platform will be further used to develop other variants of air defence systems. The Defence Acquisition Council cleared the programme on 26 March 2026.
Sudarshan CIWS		Close-in weapon system	~200 (to be ordered)	India	Status: In Service. Advanced version of Bofors L/70 manufactured by L&T Defence. System includes 3D AESA radar and has a range of 3.5 km and firing rate of 300 rounds/min. Two orders cleared: ₹6,000 crore (equivalent to ₹73 billion or US$780 million in 2026) order cleared by Defence Acquisition Council (DAC) for Indian Army in 2022.; ₹7,000 crore (equivalent to ₹75 billion or US$800 million in 2026) order cleared for 240 guns by CCS for Indian Air Force in 2024.
		Anti-aircraft gun	220 planned	India	Status: User trials from July 2025. RfP sent in October 2021. Contract by June 2026. To replace L/70 and Zu-23. Two Indian firms have bid for guns and smart ammunition. The contract includes 1,41,576 rounds of ammunition including 37,440 programmable rounds.

=== Radars ===
Name	Image	Type	Quantity	Origin	Notes
DRDO Air Defence Tactical Control Radar (ADTCR)		Air defence radar	N/A	India	Status: Under development.
Rajendra		Passive electronically scanned array radar	N/A	India	Status: In service.
INDRA-I/II		Passive electronically scanned array radar	N/A	India	Status: In service.
Rohini		3D radar	N/A	India	Status: In service.
Bharani		Low-level lightweight 2D radar	N/A	India	Status: In service.
Low Level Light Weight Radars			30	India	Status: Cleared by defence ministry in December 2025, tender issued in Feb 2026.
BEL Battle Field Surveillance Radar		Short range battle field surveillance radar	1400+	India	Status: In service.
BEL Atulya		Fire-control radar		India	Status: On order. Known as Air Defence Fire Control Radar (ADFCR). Supports L/70 guns.
Flycatcher		Fire-control radar	260+	India Netherlands	Status: In service. Domestically produced under license by BEL for L/70 guns. To be replaced by BEL Atulya fire-control radar.
Swathi Weapon Locating Radar		Counter-battery radar	49 (Operational); 43 Mk.1; 6 Mk.2	India	Status: In service. Mk.1 is the plain variant while Mk.2 is the mountain variant.
AN/TPQ-37 Firefinder		Counter-battery radar	12	United States	Status: In service.

=== Sensors and processing systems ===
Name	Image	Type	Quantity	Origin	Notes
Akashteer		Automated Air Defence Control & Reporting System	107 in service. Total 455 on order.	India	Status: In service. Has been integrated with Integrated Air Command & Control System (IACCS).
Sanjay		Battlefield Surveillance System	N/A	India	Status: In service.
Advanced Radio Frequency Monitoring System		Radio Frequency Monitoring	N/A	India	Status: In service.

=== Jammers and electronic warfare systems ===
Name	Image	Type	Quantity	Origin	Notes
Tarang Shakti EW System		Electronic Warfare System	N/A	India	Status: In service.
Dharashakti Integrated Electronic Warfare System		Electronic Warfare System	N/A	India	Status: Cleared by Defence Ministry. Formally sanctioned for a large-scale production order valued at ₹5,150 crore (equivalent to ₹53 billion or US$570 million in 2026) by the Defence Acquisition Council (DAC).
Drone Jammer System		Drone Jammer	N/A	India	Status: In service.
Axiscades Man Portable Counter Drone Systems (MPCDS)		Drone Jammer		India	Status: 12 on order. Range: 5 km.
BEL SAKSHAM		Counter unmanned air system (C-UAS)		India	Status: Being inducted. Effective up to 3,000 m (9,800 ft) altitude from ground level. Will be deployed with every battalion on border as a modular C2 system. Inductions will be completed within 2026.

== Missile systems ==
=== Close-range ===
Maximum range of 150 km
Name	Image	Type	Quantity	Origin	Notes
Gun-launched missiles
9M119 Svir (AT-11 Sniper)		Anti-tank guided missile	25,000	India; Russia	Status: In service. Gun-launched ATGM used on the Indian Army's T-90S and T-72 tanks.Bharat Dynamics Limited signed a contract with MOD for Invar anti-tank guided missiles on 19-Aug-2013. It is reported that 10,000 will be procured from Russia while BDL will manufacture 15,000. Further Orders are also planned tto upgrade T-90 tanks.
SAMHO		Anti-tank guided missile		India	Status: Under development
Multirole missiles
Lightweight Multirole Missile (LMM)		Laser-guided battlefield missile (ASM, AAM, SAM and SSM)		United Kingdom	Status: On order. $468 million deal signed on 9 October 2025. To be manufactured in Belfast.
Vehicle-launched missiles
9M113 Konkurs-M		Vehicle-mounted and man-portable anti-tank guided missile	25,000+	India; Russia	Status: In service. For BMP-2, manufactured locally in India by Bharat Dynamics Limited. The systems were upgraded with Tonbo Imaging's cooled, longwave Infrared (LWIR) thermal imagers known as Sarisa.

=== Battlefield-range ===
Maximum range of 350 km
Name	Image	Type	Quantity	Origin	Notes
Prahaar		Tactical ballistic missile	Unknown	India	Status: Unknown. 150–200 km range.
Prithvi II		Tactical ballistic missile	Unknown	India	Status: In service. 150–350 km range.

=== Theatre-range ===
Maximum range of 3,500 km
Name	Image	Type	Quantity	Origin	Notes
Short-range missiles (maximum range of 1,000 km)
Pralay		Short-range ballistic missile with maneuverable reentry vehicle	370 ordered	India	Status: In service. 150–400 km range.
BrahMos		Supersonic short-range cruise missile	120 launchers	India; Russia	Status: In service. 290–700 km range. 5 regiments are operational. Each regiment have 24 launchers or 72 ready to fire missiles.
Medium-range missiles (maximum range of 3,500 km)
Agni-I		Medium-range ballistic missile	N/A	India	Status: In service. 700–1250 km range.
Nirbhay		Medium-range cruise missile	N/A	India	Status: Induction phase. 1,000–1,500 km range.
Shaurya		Medium-range ballistic missile with maneuverable reentry vehicle	N/A	India	Status: In service. 700–1900 km range.
Agni-II		Medium-range ballistic missile	N/A	India	Status: In service. 2,000–3,500 km range.

=== Long-range ===
Range greater than 3,500 km
Name	Image	Type	Quantity	Origin	Notes
Intermediate-range missiles (maximum range of 5,500 km)
Agni-III		Intermediate-range ballistic missile	N/A	India	Status: In service. 3,500 km range.
Agni-IV		Intermediate-range ballistic missile	N/A	India	Status: In service. 4,000 km range.
Intercontinental missiles (range greater than 5,500 km)
Agni-V		Intercontinental ballistic missile	N/A	India	Status: In service. 5,500–7,500 km range

== Vessels ==
Name	Image	Origin	Type	Quantity	Notes
Aquarius Flat Bottomed Boat		India	Landing Craft Assault	17	Status: In service mostly in the Pangong Tso. Flat-bottomed boat made of fiberglass with a length of 35 ft (11 m). Capable of carrying 20–22 troops, and reaching a speed of 20 knots (37 km/h). Made by Aquarius Shipyard Pvt Ltd.
GSL Fast Patrol Boat		India	Patrol Boat	12	Status: In service. Made by Goa Shipyard. Used for patrolling in Pangong Tso lake. The boats are specially equipped with anti-ramming features, optical sensors, weapon systems and other specialized surveillance gears.
Tempest 35 Swat Patrol Craft		United States	Patrol Boat	17	Status: In service. Used for patrolling in Pangong Tso lake. These high-speed interceptor boats are equipped with GPS, sonar, echo-sounder and infrared night-vision cameras. It can reach speeds up to 40 knots and carry 10 fully armed soldiers.

== Loitering munition ==
Name	Variant	Quantity	Origin	Notes
Long range (100 km and above)
Harop		N/A	Israel	
Berkut-BM		N/A	Belarus	Several dozens bought as per reports.
Harpy		N/A	Israel	
SkyStriker		100	IsraelIndia	Manufactured by Adani Group's Alpha Design Technologies.
TASL ALS Mk-II			India	Status: On order. Quantity: 54 systems and 540 munitions. Range: <100 km. Contract signed in August 2026 with deliveries within a year. User: Shaktibaan regiments and Divyastra batteries.
NIBE Vayu Astra-1			India	Status: On order. Quantity: 30 systems and 300 munitions. Range: <100 km. Contract signed in August 2026 with deliveries within a year. User: Shaktibaan regiments and Divyastra batteries.
Medium range (10 km to 50 km)
Warmate		>100	Poland	
Nagastra-1 Nagastra-1R		480 450	India	
Short range (less than 10 km)
Johnnette JM-1		>150	India	
L-Spike 1x		200	Israel	
Hoverbee		N/A	India	

== Future procurement and projects ==
The major ongoing weapons programmes of the Indian Army are:

=== Mechanised forces ===
- Future Main Battle Tank (FMBT) – Project to develop an upgraded version of the Arjun Mk1A with fourth generation capabilities. It will be a 55 tonne tank powered by the under development indigenous DRDO DATRAN 1500 engine producing 1,500 hp (1,100 kW) . The MBT is in its design stage.
- Future Ready Combat Vehicle (FRCV) – Programme to replace T-72s with next generation tanks. The tank will have weight of less than 60 tonnes, carry 4 troops and will feature superior mobility, all terrain ability, multilayered protections, precision and lethal fires, and real-time situational awareness along with artificial intelligence, drone integration, active protection system, network centric operation capabilities. It should be transportable by existing infrastructure of rail, road and aircraft. Around 1,770 units shall be inducted in three phases (approx. 590 each). The FRCV project is renamed as Project Ranjit as reported in November 2024.
- Future Infantry Combat Vehicle (FICV) – Induction of 1,750 tracked infantry fighting vehicles in phases to replace the ageing BMP-2 Sarath.
- Stryker – 530 planned for purchase to equip 10 wheeled standard mechanised infantry battalions.
- Armoured personnel carrier (wheeled) – RFI under formulation to purchase 105 APCs for wheeled reconnaissance and support battalions of Mechanised Infantry.
- NAMIS (Tr.) – A contract, worth ₹1,801.34 crore (equivalent to ₹19 billion or US$200 million in 2026), for 13 NAMICA carriers and 293 Nag missiles placed with Armoured Vehicle Nigam.
- NAMIS (Tr.) Mk II – A procurement for 107 NAMICA Mk2 carriers and 2,408 Nag Mk2 missiles cleared by the Defence Acquisition Council on 23 October 2025.

=== Missiles ===
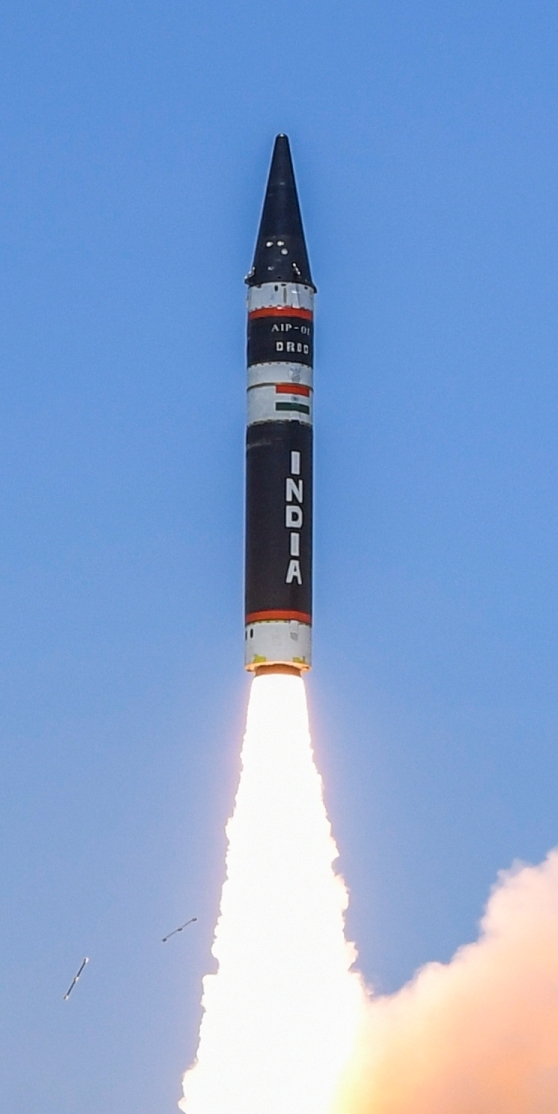
Agni P missile test fired

- Ballistic missiles
  - Prahaar (missile) – With a range of 150 km (90 mi).
  - Agni P- Also known as Agni Prime. 1,000–2,000 km (620–1,240 mi) range. To replace Agni-I.
  - Agni-V – 7,000–8,000 km (4,300–5,000 mi) Successfully tested for the ninth time by DRDO on 22 December 2022.
  - Agni-VI – 10,000–12,000 km (6,200–7,500 mi) range with MIRVed warheads. Currently in planning stage.
- Cruise missiles
  - Hypersonic cruise missile
  - Nirbhay Missile
  - BrahMos NG

=== Howitzers ===
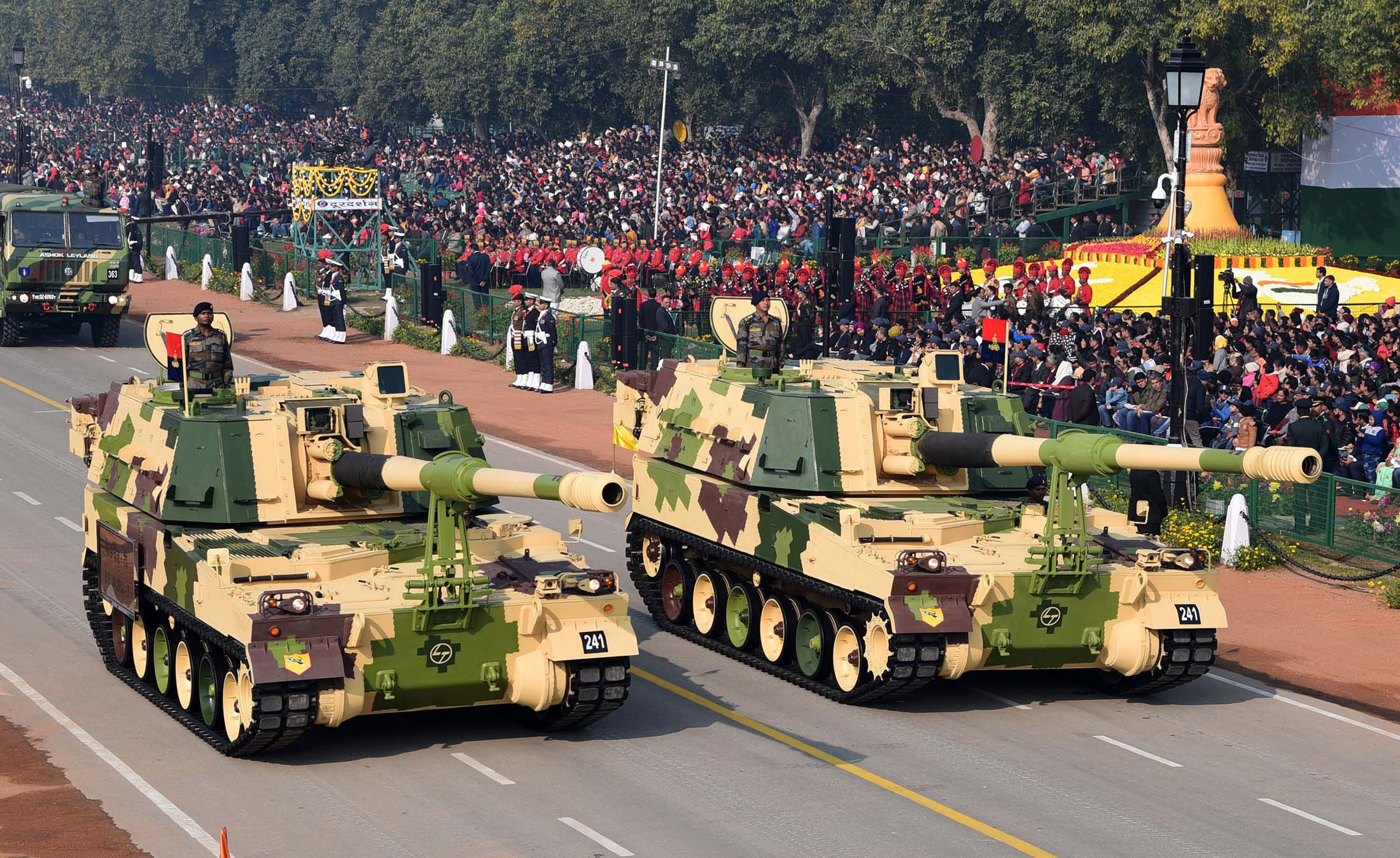
K-9 VAJRA-T at the 71st Republic Day (2020)

- Under the Field Artillery Rationalisation Plan (FARP) of 2010, the army plans to procure 3,000–4,000 units of artillery at the cost of ₹200 billion (US$2 billion). This includes purchasing 1580 towed, 814 mounted, 180 self-propelled wheeled, 100 self-propelled tracked, and 145 ultra-light 155 mm/39 calibre guns. The requirement for artillery guns would be met with indigenous development and production.
  - Towed Guns - 114 Dhanush ordered (18 delivered), 307 ATAGS planned, 1,200 155 mm L/52 howitzers planned.
  - Mounted Guns - 200 105 mm L/37 howitzers and 814 155 mm L/52 howitzers planned.
  - Self propelled tracked guns - 100 K-9 Vajra-T delivered, 100 on order; another 100 planned.
  - Ultra light howitzer - 145 M777 guns delivered.

=== Helicopters ===
- Reconnaissance and Surveillance Helicopters (RSH) – In order to replace Chetak and Cheetah helicopters in the Indian Armed Forces, the Ministry of Defence had issued a Request for Information (RFI) for the procurement of 200 light helicopters under the RSH programme in August 2025. Under the programme, 120 units and 80 units are to be procured for the Indian Army and Air Force, respectively. Specifying the technical requirements, the RFI mentioned that the suppliers are expected to be Indian vendors partnering with original equipment manufacturers (OEM). The helicopters are expected to be capable of undertaking reconnaissance, surveillance and search and rescue operations in day and night. The requirements include at least one hardpoint per side for surveillance equipment, podded guns, articulated guns, air-to-air missiles or anti-tank missiles. The first Light Utility Helicopter (LUH) tender was launched in 2008 for 197 helicopters (133 for IA and 64 for IAF) but was cancelled in 2014. Later, India moved ahead with the proposal of Russian Helicopters to produce Ka-226T in India. The proposal included 60 helicopters to be directly purchased and 140 be produced in India by Indo-Russian Helicopters Pvt Ltd, a joint venture of HAL, Russian Helicopters and Rosoboronexport. However, the deal was not signed due to the stringent ToT demands and Safran Helicopter Engines denying to supply its Arrius 2G1 engine to Russia. The Defence Acquisition Council (DAC) approved the procurement of Light Multi Role Helicopters (LMRH) for the Indian Army and Air Force at ₹20,000 crore (US$2.1 billion) on 26 October 2026. The orders would be split between L1 and L2 contenders.
  - Bell Textron, along with its Indian partner Max AeroSpace and Aviation, is expected to offer Bell 407 helicopter in the competition.
  - Airbus will also offer the Made-in-India H125 along with Tata Advanced Systems. It was one of the shortlisted designs in the 2008 LUH tender.
  - Leonardo and Adani Defence & Aerospace have offered the AW109 TrekkerM design under a strategic partnership to establish India's helicopter manufacturing ecosystem.

=== Remotely Piloted Aircraft (RPA) ===
- As of September 2022, the Indian Army expected to equip its Regiment of Artillery units two types of UAVs, one with a range of 15–20 km (9.3–12.4 mi) and endurance of 2 hours and the other with a range of 80 km (50 mi) and endurance of 4 hours. The procurement, if undertaken, would make the first UAVs not to be operated by Army Aviation Corps.
- As per a Request for Information (RFI) released in February 2025, the Indian Army plans to procure 1,000 Surveillance Copter (High Altitude Area) capable of operating at an altitude of 5,500 m (18,000 ft) above mean sea level during both day and night.
- The Technology Perspective and Capability Roadmap (TPCR) 2025 states the Indian Army's requirement of 55–70 stealth RPAs for specialised roles including SIGNIT, Electronic Attack and surveillance of weapons of mass destruction. The RPAs, categorised as either MALE or HALE, must have a range of about 1,500 km (930 mi) and an operation altitude of 50,000–60,000 ft (15–18 km). The RPAs also should be equipped with equipment for communication interception, weapons jamming and NBC detection with capability for Direction of Own Artillery Fire.
- The TPCR also outlines the requirement of stealth unmanned combat aerial vehicles (UCAVs) with a service life of over 20 years. The Army and Air Force are expected operate between 90–100 and 40–50 stealth UCAVs, respectively. The UCAV is expected to achieve supersonic speeds with supercruise and low observability capabilities. The internal weapons payload is expected within a range of 4,000 kg (8,800 lb) and should be compatible with both air-to-air and air-to-ground missiles. The UCAVs should exhibit Manned-Unmanned Teaming (MUMT) including loyal wingman role. The system should feature an AI-driven programmable flight profile with advanced avionics, LPI radar, EO/IR/SWIR targeting, secure low-latency SATCOM/B-LOS and LOS links, conformal defensive stores, and autonomous aerial refueling. It must also achieve a service ceiling of at least 15 km while supporting offensive and defensive manoeuvres. The DRDO is developing its DRDO Ghatak on the same lines.
- On 29 December 2025, the Defence Acquisition Council (DAC) cleared the Indian Army proposal to procure 850 loitering munitions with launchers worth ₹2,000 crore (equivalent to ₹21 billion or US$220 million in 2026) from Indian sources. The munitions will equip the Shaktibaan regiments and Divyastra batteries of the Indian Army Regiment of Artillery. This is part of an overall procurement of 30,000 such munitions to equip all three defence forces as well as special forces.

=== Vehicles ===
- The army needs 3,000 light support vehicles and 1,600 heavy motor vehicles for mounting rockets and radar, and for reconnaissance and transportation, at a cost of Rs 15 billion.
- Indian Army has issued a requirement of 650 6×6 High Mobility Vehicles (HMV) with material handling crane for ammunition and heavy equipment transportation in mountainous terrains.
- On 23 June 2021, the Indian Army issued an RFI for about 2,000 Gun Towing Vehicles for towing 155 mm Medium Artillery Guns. The GTVs should have a towing capacity of 20 tonnes along with a payload capacity of 8 tonnes to carry ammunition, stores and gun crew across all terrains.
- In July 2022, an RFI was issued for the procurement of 800 Light Armoured Multipurpose Vehicle (LAMV) including two variants, namely, Version 1 and Version 2. through a "single-stage, two-bid system" and the quantity has to be delivered within 36 months of contract singing at 300 LAMVs per year. The vehicles will equip the Reconnaissance (Recce) & Surveillance Platoons of Mechanised Infantry and Recce Troops of Armoured Corps for Reconnaissance and Surveillance operations. By design, the LAMV has to be a modular 4×4 vehicle with seating for four troops including driver along with 360° gun hatches mounted with 7.62 MAG and a detachable plate with STANAG Level 1 protection to cover the frontal 120° arc.
  - The Version 1 is expected to have a minimum payload of 1.25 tons with a troops compartment and a STANAG Level 1 protection. The Version 1 will be equipped with a telescopic retractable mast with a maximum height of at least 3 m, 360° swivel capability and 50 kg capacity to mount in service BFSR-SR and Hand Held Thermal Imager (HHTI).
  - Meanwhile, the Version 2 is expected to have a minimum payload of 2 tons with a crew and a cargo compartment, each with a seating of two, and a STANAG Level 2 protection. The version will be equipped with a range of three options including Integrated Surveillance and Targeting System, Continuous Unmanned Tied Surveillance System or Anti-Thermal Anti-Laser Smoke Grenade Launchers. The first two systems will be integral with the cargo compartment of LAMV Version 2 and operated by the Vehicle Commander.
    - The Integrated Surveillance and Targeting System is a combination of Surveillance Drones and Loitering Munitions, each with a one way range of 15 km, and an endurance of 90 and 60 minutes, respectively.
    - The Continuous Unmanned Tied Surveillance System, a combination of Surveillance Drones and Portable Ground Control Station, will have a range and endurance of over 15 km and 60 minutes in untethered mode and an extended endurance of 12 hours in tethered mode.
    - The vehicle will have provisions to be equipped with four Anti-Thermal Anti-Laser Smoke Grenade Launchers (AT AL SGL) on either side with ammunitions capable of producing a smoke screen with a height and width of 10 m and 30 m, respectively, and a duration of 20 seconds.
- In early July 2025, the Indian Army issued an RFI for 400 High Mobility Reconnaissance Vehicles (HMRVs). The contact is said to be through a "single-stage, two-bid system" and the quantity has to be delivered within 24 months of contract singing with long-term product support. The HRMV must have at least 50% indigenous content. By design, the HMRV has to be a modular 4×4 vehicle with seating for four troops, 360° gun hatches, communication systems, software-defined radios, storage space for ammunition & gear, self-recovery equipment air conditioning systems, fire suppression units, and environmental controls for extreme conditions. The HMRV will be used to equip Armoured Regiments of the Armoured Corps and Reconnaissance & Support Battalions of the Mechanised Infantry to support "real-time surveillance and targeting equipment such as unmanned aerial vehicles (UAVs), loitering munitions". The RFI can be responded to by Original Equipment Manufacturers (OEMs), authorised vendors, and export agencies following which, they will be shortlisted for field trials. The final selection will be based on technical evaluations and cost-effectiveness. The last date to respond to RFI is 1 September 2025.
- In May 2026, the Indian Army issued an RFI to procure 159 bullet-proof troop carriers (BPTCs) for Rashtriya Rifles battalions, sector and force headquarters in J&K and Ladakh. An Indian vendor will be identified to supply the vehicles at an annual rate of at least 60 units post-contract. The vehicles must have an on-road and off-road maximum speed of 80–100 km/h (50–62 mph) and 50–75 km/h (31–47 mph), respectively, as well as a range of 350 km (220 mi) on plains and 300 km (190 mi) on mountains. The vehicles must also be capable of operating at an altitude of 5,000 m (16,000 ft) and temperatures ranging from –10 °C to +40 °C including snowclad regions. The vehicle must also be equipped with firing pods roof top hatch for machine guns.

=== Vessels ===
- On 17 October 2023, reports revealed Army's plans to procure eight Landing Craft Assaults (LCA) along with six Fast Patrol Boats (FPB) for amphibious operations in the Sir Creek region and Brahmaputra basin region. The service released two Request for Information (RFI) for the purpose with both designs mandated to be indigenous with over 60% domestic content. The due date to respond was 28 November. In October and the second week November 2025, Army released two commercial tenders, or Request for Proposals (RfP), for the procurement of Fast Patrol Boats and Landing Craft Assaults, respectively. The boat are expected to have a service life of 10 years or 10,000 hours of operation.
  - The LCAs are meant for transport of vehicles and material, along with patrols and limited search and rescue operations. The vessels must be capable of being operated in minimal draft. They are required to have a length of 13–14 m, speed of over 20 knots, and an endurance of eight hours. They will have a toal capacity of 35 personnel or 5,255 kg (11,585 lb) and would also be able to carry a Tata Storme (or equivalent) car with 12 troops and 3,990 kg (8,800 lb) along with ammunition and equipment. It should also be transportable by road, rail or aircraft, Il-76 or C-17.
  - The FPBs, on the other hand, are meant for small team insertion for surveillance and reconnaissance, patrolling and interception at sea and water bodies. They are expected to have a speed of 29 knots with eight people on board.

== Field firing ranges ==
This is a list of the Indian military's field firing ranges, which are used for testing weapons, training troops, and wargaming.

- "Mahe, Ladakh#MFFR|Mahe Field Firing Range" (MFFR), Ladakh.
- Mahajan Field Firing Range, on NH-62 halfway between Suratgarh and Bikaner, Rajasthan.
- Hisar Field Firing Range, on MDR-108 between Kanwari and Badya Jattan in Hisar district, Haryana.
- Pokhran Test Range, Pokran, Rajasthan.
- High-altitude Field Firing Range in Tawang sector in Arunachal Pradesh.

== See also ==
- Currently active military equipment by country
- List of regiments of the Indian Army
- Women in Indian Armed Forces
- Ranks In Indian Army

== Sources ==
- International Institute for Strategic Studies (15 February 2023). The Military Balance 2023. Taylor & Francis. ISBN 978-1-000-91070-4.
- International Institute for Strategic Studies (13 February 2024). The Military Balance 2024. London: Routledge. ISBN 978-1-032-78004-7.
