= Ashok Leyland FAT =

Ashok Leyland Field Artillery Tractor
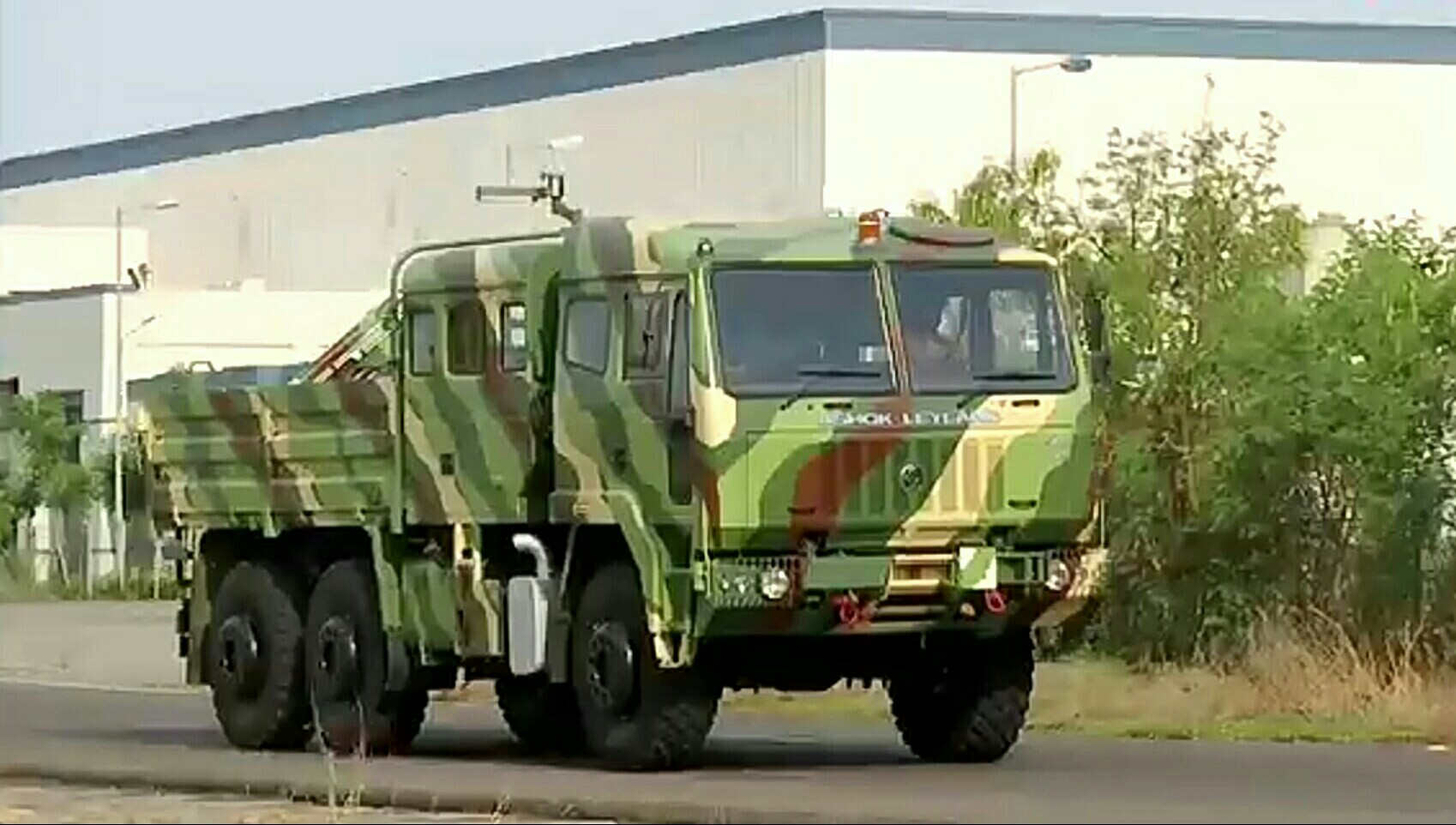
- FAT 6×6 undergoing trials
- Type: Medium/Heavy truck (4×4 and 6×6)
- Place of origin: India

Service history
- In service: 2017-present
- Used by: Indian Army; Tanzanian Army

Production history
- Designer: Ashok Leyland Defence Systems
- Manufacturer: Ashok Leyland
- Produced: 2017–present

Specifications
- Mass: 9,945 kg (9.945 t) (4×4); 22,000 kg (22 t) (6×6)
- Length: 6282 mm (4×4); 8730 mm (6×6)
- Width: 2500 mm (4×4); 2600 mm (6×6)
- Height: 2950 mm (4×4); 3300 mm (6×6)
- Crew: 4 operators + 6 additional spaces
- Engine: 8.1 L I6 Neptune CRS turbo-diesel 160 hp (4×4); 360 hp (6×6)
- Payload capacity: 3,000 kg (4×4); 8,000 kg (6×6)
- Transmission: 6-speed manual (4×4); 8-speed manual (6×6)
- Suspension: Semi elliptic multi leaf spring with Double acting telescopic shock absorber at Front & rear (4×4); Parabolic Leaf Spring at Front & Bogie suspension at rear with shock absorber at both Front & Rear (6×6)
- Ground clearance: 300 mm (4×4); 400 mm (6×6)
- Fuel capacity: 212 L (4×4); 350 L (6×6)
- Operational range: 700 km
- Maximum speed: 86 km/h
- Steering system: power-assisted steering

The Ashok Leyland FAT is a family of all-terrain military truck designed, developed and produced by Indian automobile manufacturer Ashok Leyland. The design is broadly based on Ashok Leyland Super Stallion truck. It is primarily used for towing a wide range of artillery guns. It will replace the aging fleet of KrAZ-255 and Scania SBAT111S used by the Indian Army.

There are two variants of the truck

- Ashok Leyland FAT 4×4 or Ashok Leyland Topchi (payload capacity of 3 tonnes)
- Ashok Leyland FAT 6×6 or Ashok Leyland GTV 6×6 (payload capacity of 8 tonnes)

== Development ==
In 1986, when the Indian Army purchased 410 FH77B Bofors howitzers, they also ordered 660 SBAT111S trucks. 30 years later, these trucks had become obsolete and the Army looked for a replacement.

Ashok Leyland is one of the biggest suppliers of logistics vehicles to Indian Army; the company's Stallion truck has over 60,000 units in service with Indian Army. Thus, the development of FAT or Field Artillery Tractor was started as a private venture to replace the ageing fleet of Scania trucks.

== Design & features ==
=== Ashok Leyland FAT 4×4 ===
It is powered by Ashok Leyland's in-house developed engine that gives 160 hp (120 kW) of power and 550 Nm of maximum torque. This is mated to a 6-speed manual transmission. The truck runs on full-time 4-wheel drive system with all axles having differential lock. The FAT 4×4's towing capacity is rated at 3 tonnes. The cargo bay is fitted with a crane for loading/unloading ammunition and other equipment.

=== Ashok Leyland GTV 6×6 ===
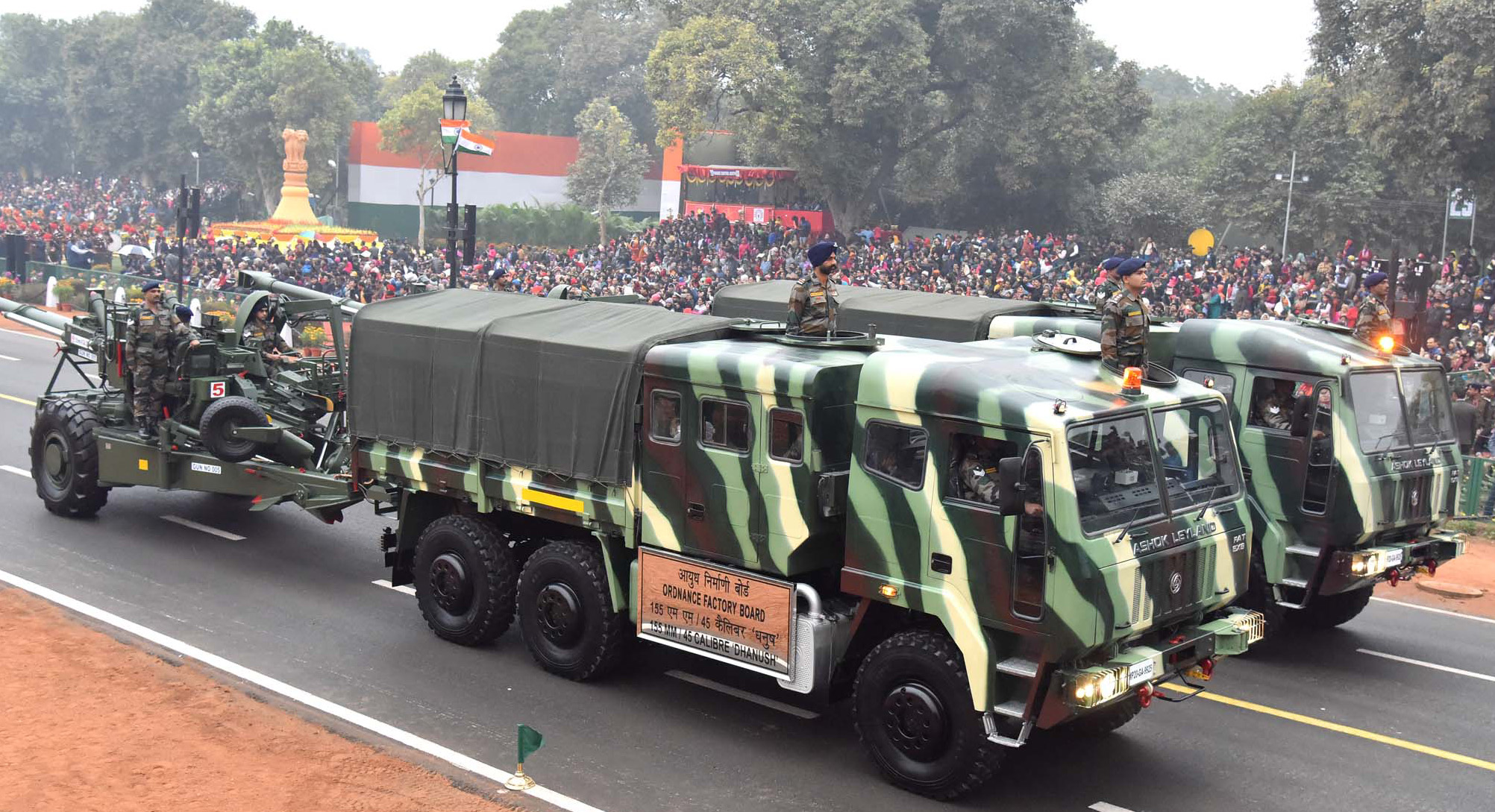
Ashok Leyland FAT towing a Dhanush howitzer during Republic Day Parade 2017.

It is powered by Ashok Leyland's in-house developed 8-litre Neptune series engine that gives 360 hp (270 kW) of power and 1,400 Nm of torque at 1,300 rpm. This is mated to an 8-speed manual transmission (2-speed transfer case). The truck runs on full-time 6-wheel drive system with all axles having differential lock.

The FAT 6x6's towing capacity is rated at 8 tonnes. The driver's cabin can hold four people and the crew cabin just behind it can hold six. The cargo bay is fitted with a 2.7 tonne crane for loading/unloading ammunition and other equipment. There is a roof hatch for observation, emergency exit and firing. At the front, the truck has a 10 tonne self-recovery winch.

Other features include a fire and smoke detection unit, an infrared rear-view camera and Indeginised Rotex central tire inflation system. For driver's comfort, cab is equipped with HVAC.

== Production ==
In March 2016, Ashok Leyland won a contract for supplying 450 units of the FAT 6x6 along with other "Super Stallion" vehicles and 825 units of "Ambulance 4x4" to the army. The total order was worth ₹825 crore. In 2017, the first batch of trucks was delivered.

In July 2023, another order was placed for Field Artillery Tractor (FAT) 4×4 [Ashok Leyland Topchi] and Gun Towing Vehicle (GTV) 6×6 worth ₹800 crore. The order will be executed in 12 months.

== Operators ==
- India
  - Indian Army – Field Artillery Tractor (FAT) 4×4 and Gun Towing Vehicle (GTV) 6×6
- Tanzania – Field Artillery Tractor (FAT) 4×4
