= Shaktiman truck =

Shaktiman
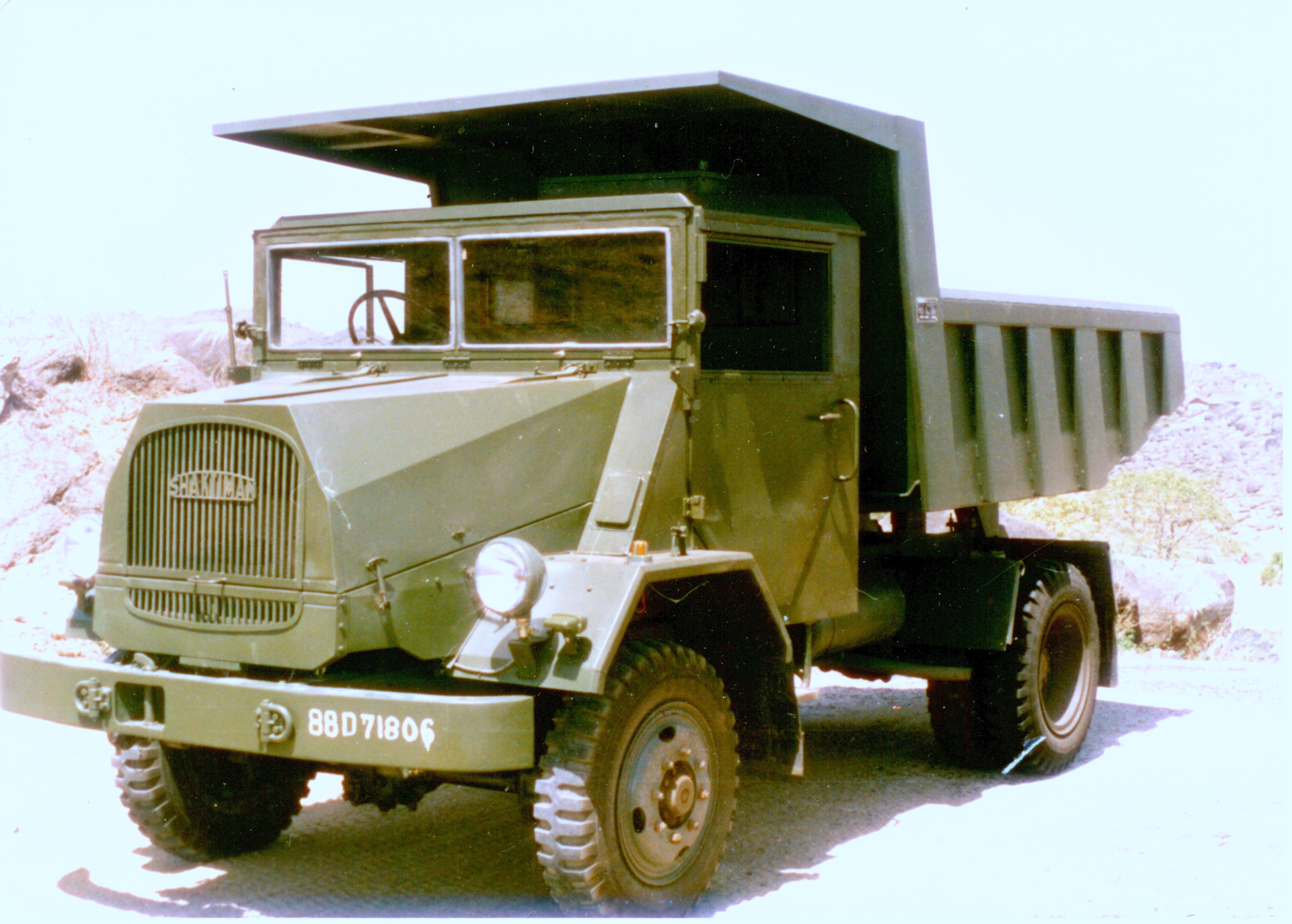
- 1980s Shaktiman tipper

Overview
- Manufacturer: Vehicle Factory Jabalpur
- Also called: Shaktiman
- Production: 1959–1996
- Assembly: Jabalpur, India

Body and chassis
- Class: Truck
- Platform: MAN 415

Powertrain
- Engine: 6 Cylinders, in-line Diesel, Direct injection
- Transmission: Clutch – Single plate, dry, dia 280 mm, Gear box = Constant mesh with 5 forward & 1 Reverse Forward Ratios 1:7.65/4.47/2.72/1.66/1.00 Reverse Ratio 1:6.86, Transfer Case Two speeds with lockable central torque split (inter Axle) different, Ratio = High 1:1, Low 1:1.755, Composite (1-Beam and Drive Shafts) with two Stage reduction, Ratio = 1:6.2

Chronology
- Successor: Ashok Leyland Stallion

The Shaktiman (Strong) is a version of the MAN 415 built under licence. Shaktiman trucks were the most widely used medium-capacity trucks of the Indian Armed Forces. They were manufactured between 1959 and 1996 by the Vehicle Factory Jabalpur, (VFJ) of the Indian Ordnance Factories Board. Over 75,000 units were produced over its lifetime, of which about 7,000 remained in active service as of 2009. Nearly all the Shaktimans have been phased out and replaced by Ashok Leyland Stallion and Tata LPTA 713 4x4s.

== Production ==
The first Shaktiman rolled off the production line at the Vehicle Factory Jabalpur (VFJ) motorvehicle factory in 1959. The five ton Shaktiman VFJ 4X4 model was based on the MAN 415. The first units were assembled using CKD-kits from Germany, the monthly production was about 250 units. As production had built up, an increasing number of the components were supplied by Indian suppliers.

The final significant order of 3000 trucks was received in 1993 from the Indian Army. This order was fulfilled by 1996. The infrastructure for the truck production was preserved for a few more years as a backup contingency option. The Shaktiman production line was dismantled in 2003.

Shaktiman models were built using all-steel cabs with flat angular surfaces to aid manufacture. Most Shaktimans had a multifuel capable, 130 PS diesel engine, and were fitted with switchable all-wheel drive. In total, over 75000 units of the truck in various configurations were produced for the Indian Armed Forces by VFJ over its lifetime.

== Design and development ==
The Shaktiman uses the conventional truck design, and is based on the MAN 415 L1 AR truck. Over time, the design was customised and evolved by VFJ with the major focus being indigenisation, and upting it. In the last few decades of its production, the truck was built entirely with components supplied by Indian vendors.

== Variants ==
The Shaktiman chassis was adapted into a wide range of variants, including:

- 4x4 and 4x2 hard and soft top variants
- 4000 litre fuel tankers
- 4000 litre water tankers
- Versions for carrying shelter bodies, primarily for theatre communications and sensor systems
- Artillery tractors with crew shelters
- A version with gross weightage of 8350 kg for towing 105 mm light field guns and other howitzers
