= Kalyani M4 =

Armoured Personnel Carrier

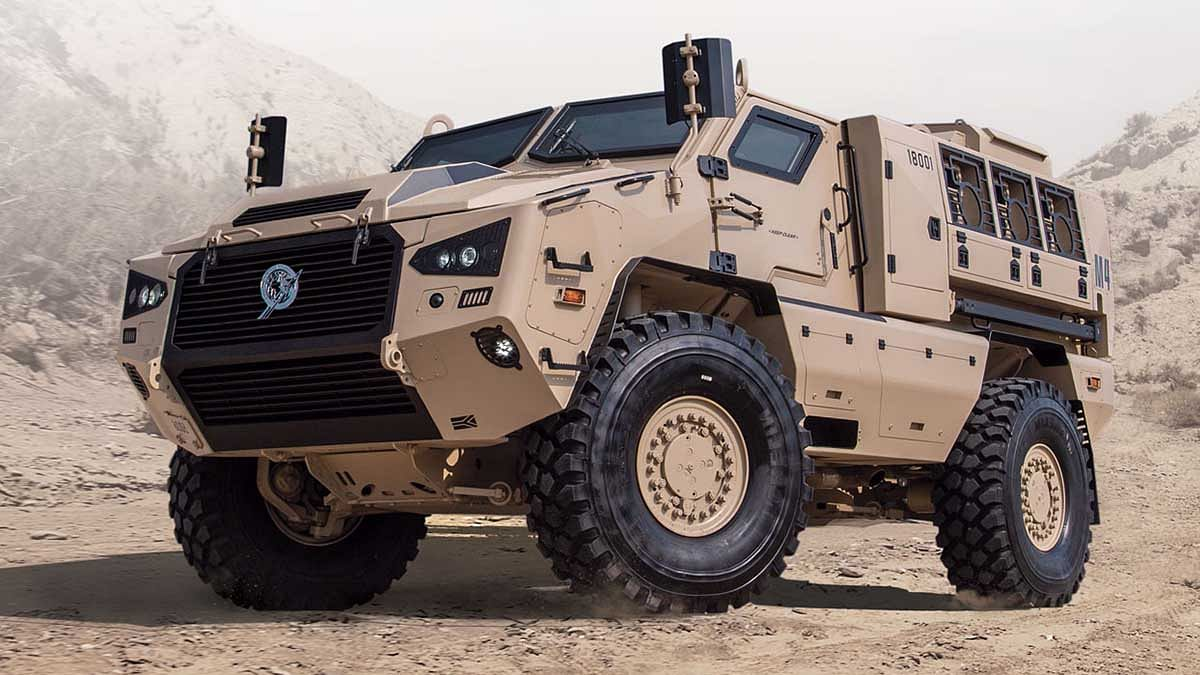
- Type: Mine-Resistant Ambush Protected Vehicle
- Place of origin: India/South Africa

Service history
- Used by: See Operators

Production history
- Designer: Kalyani Group
- Manufacturer: Bharat Forge

Specifications
- Mass: 16,000 kg total weight
- Length: 5.8 m
- Width: 2.6 m
- Height: 2.45 m
- Crew: 2+2+6
- Armor: NATO STANAG 4569 Level III
- Engine: Turbo Diesel (336 kW, 465 HP, 1627 N.m); 465 hp
- Power/weight: 30 HP/ton
- Payload capacity: 2,300 Kgs
- Transmission: 6 Speed Automatic
- Suspension: Bilstein Heavy Duty Suspension
- Operational range: 800 km
- Maximum speed: 140 km/h
- Steering system: Power steering, Front wheel

The Kalyani M4 is a high-mobility Mine-Resistant Ambush Protected Vehicle produced by Kalyani Group's Bharat Forge. It is a Kalyani-Paramount partnership developed variant of the Mbombe 4 built by South Africa's Paramount Group.

== History ==
After conducting extensive trials in Ladakh in August 2020, the Indian Army placed orders for these vehicles under an emergency procurement amidst China-India Border Standoff in a contract worth ₹177.95 crore (equivalent to ₹200 crore or US$21 million in 2023) in 2021. The trials also included the Maverick APC and the Werewolf MRAP.

In February 2021, an agreement was made between Paramount Group and Kalyani to manufacture the M4 in India.

In April 2023, Kalyani M4s were deployed by Indian peacekeepers in Abyei, Sudan.

== Design ==
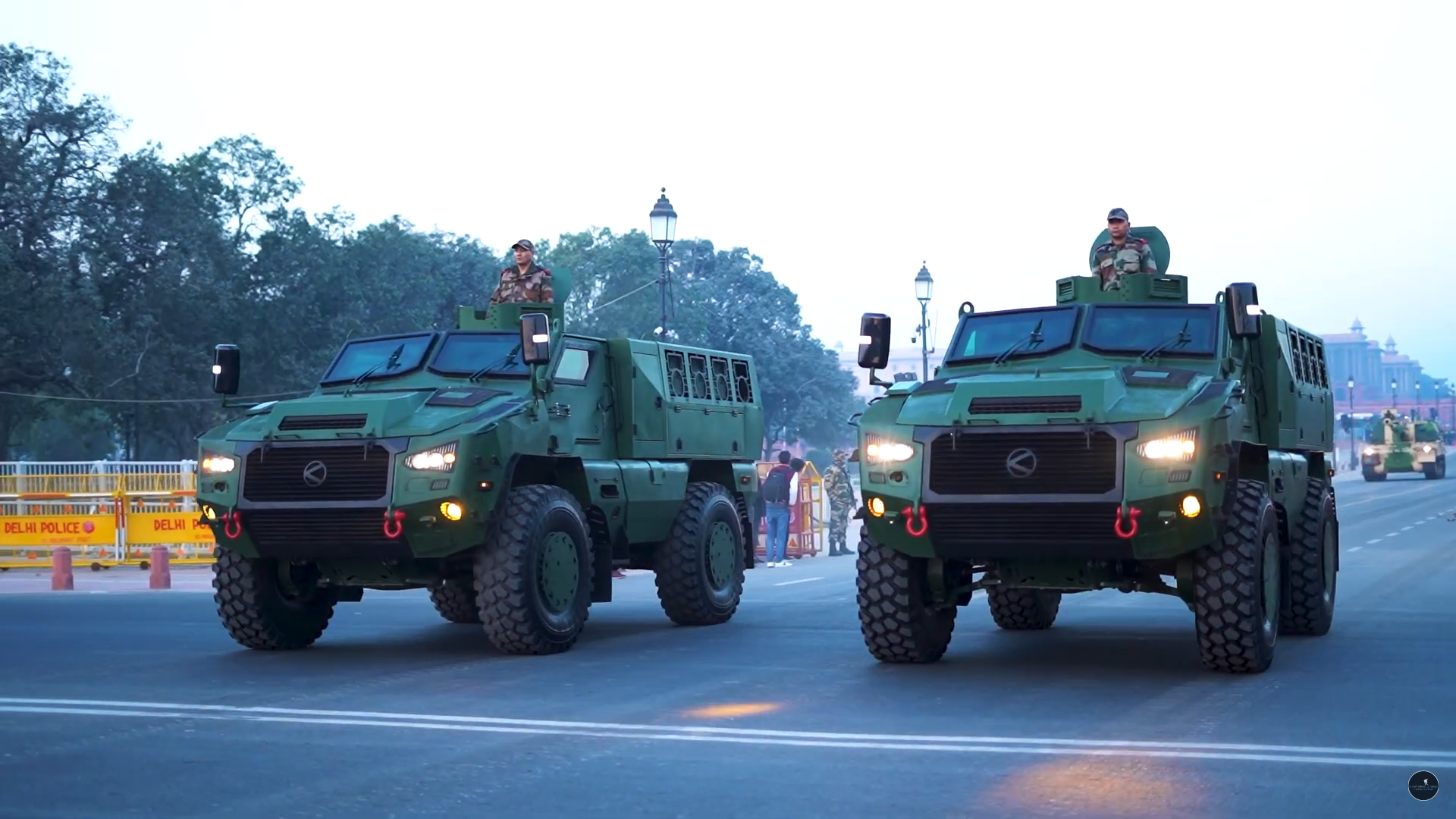
Kalyani M4 at the Kartavya Path, January 2023

The Kalyani M4 is designed predominantly as an extraction and occupant protection vehicle. Its design offers high speed and quick manoeuvrability. It has a maximum payload of 2.3 tonnes and can carry up to 8 people. With all the armour, the M4 weighs around 16,000 kg. It has a 43-degree approach and 44-degrees departure angle with a water wading depth of 900 mm to operate it in tough terrain or fording rivers.

The Kalyani M4 uses a turbocharged 6-pot diesel motor which is rated to deliver 465 hp and a 1627 Nm of torque. It uses a CVT automatic transmission. It also features a low-range gearbox to work with the 4×4 system to scale difficult steep inclines. The M4 has top speed of 140 km/h and has a range of 800 km.

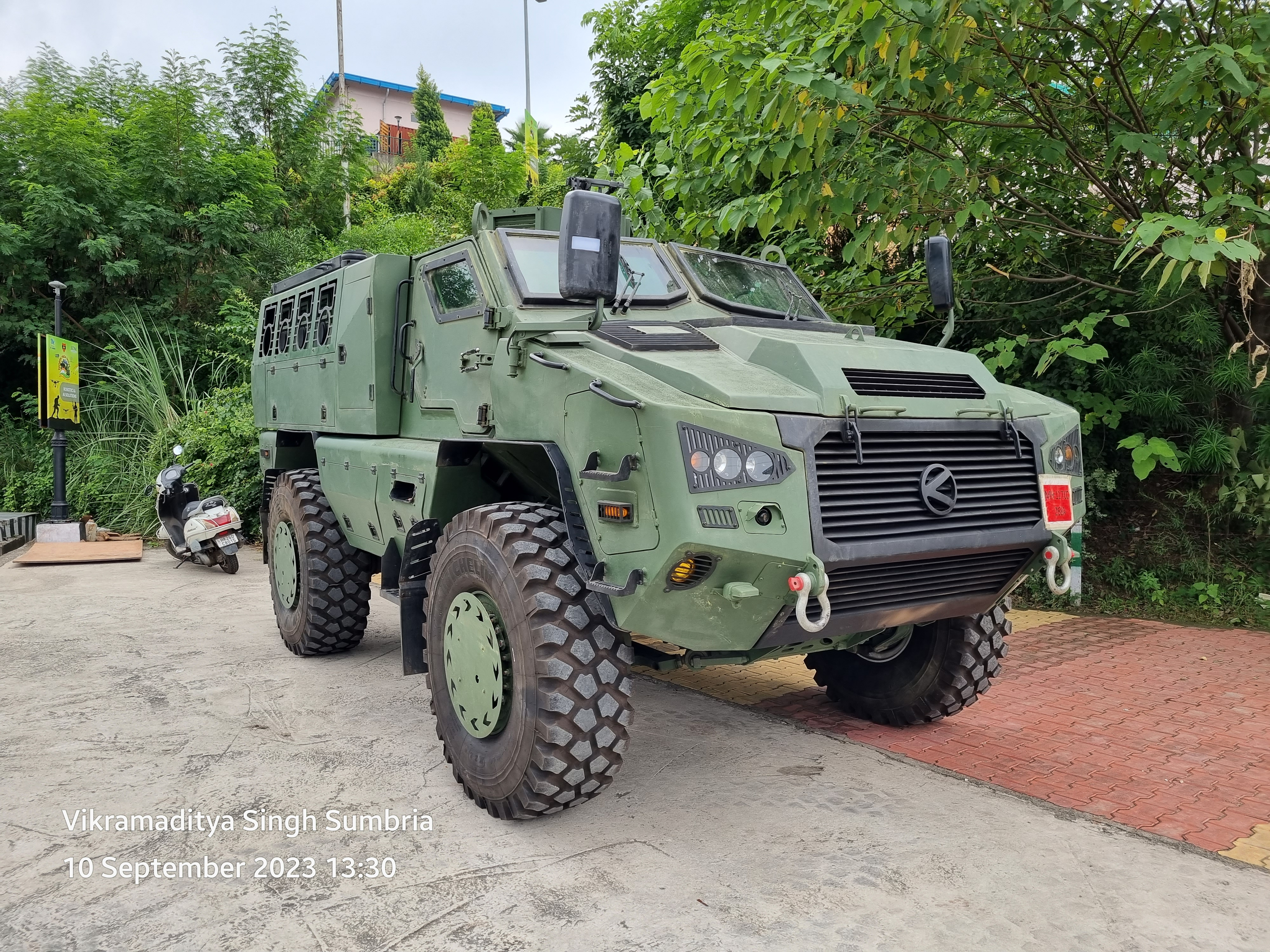
Kalyani M4 in Military Green parked in an exhibition at IIT Jammu, Jammu & Kashmir.

It can withstand three 10 kg TNT charges under the wheels and 50 kg IED side blasts.

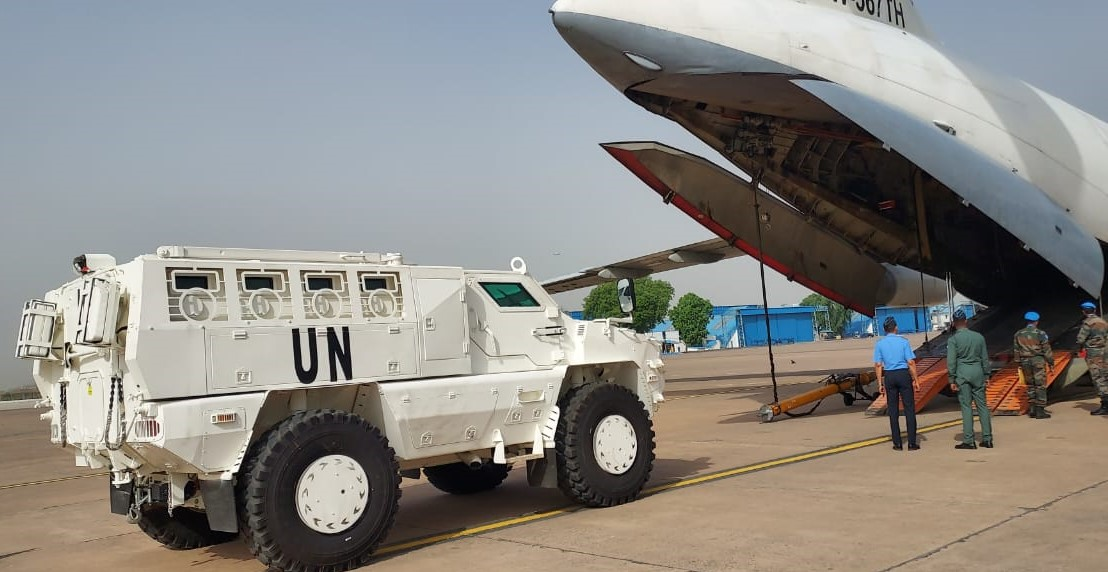
Kalyani M4 as part of Indian UN peacekeepers leaving for UNISFA, Abyei, April 2022.

== Operators ==
India
Indian Army – 126 with 100 more on order.

== See also ==
- Ashok Leyland Light Bullet Proof Vehicles(LBPV)
- Mahindra Axe
- Mahindra Armored Light Specialist Vehicle
- Mahindra Marksman
- TATA Kestrel
