= 12 cm mobile coastal artillery gun m/80 =

12 cm mobile coastal artillery gun w/80
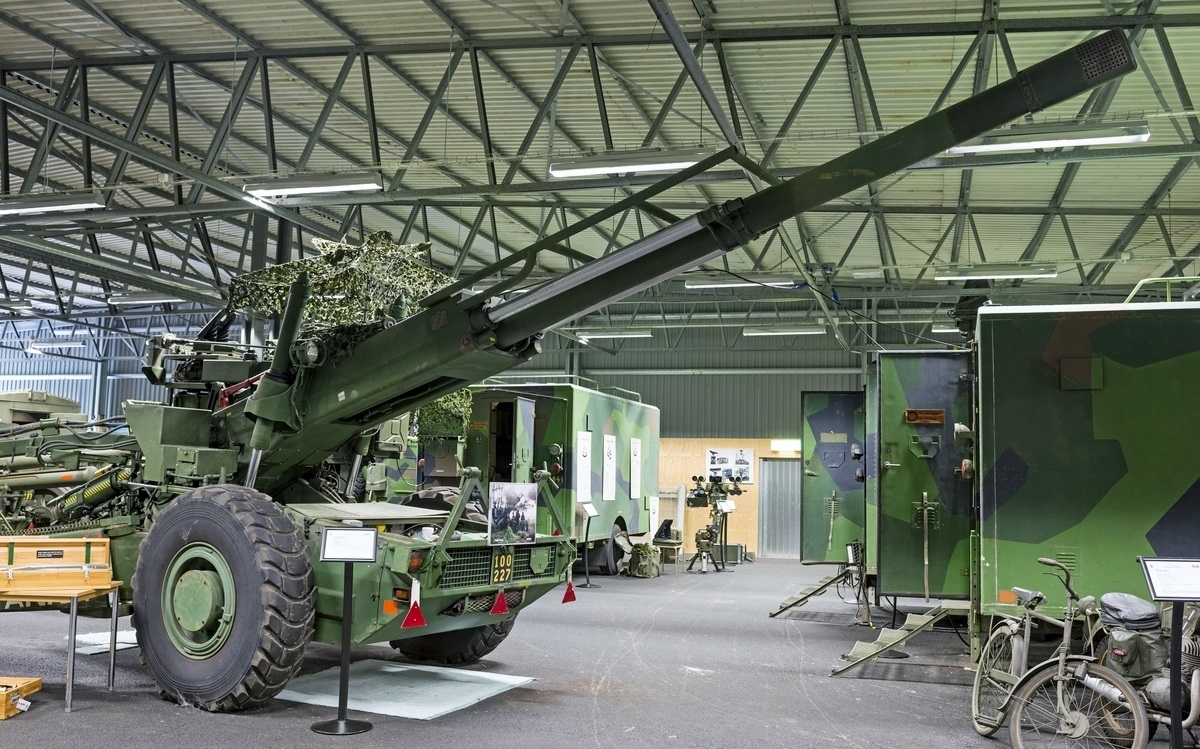
- Type: Coastal artillery
- Place of origin: Sweden

Service history
- In service: 1981–2003
- Used by: Sweden

Production history
- Manufacturer: Bofors
- No. built: 24

Specifications
- Caliber: 12 cm
- Rate of fire: 16 shots/minute
- Effective firing range: 32 km

The 12 cm mobile coastal artillery piece m/80 (Swedish: 12 cm rörlig kustartilleripjäs m/80 or R Kapj 12/80), also known as KARIN, was a 12 cm Swedish coastal artillery gun developed by Bofors.

== History ==
During its development, the gun was referred to as KARIN (Coastal Artillery's Mobile Invasion Defense). It was designed as a variant of the Haubits 77 sharing significant similarities in construction. Trials began in 1977, and the first production gun was delivered in 1981. Training for conscripts started in 1980, and the first complete combat units were ready in 1983. Six batteries, each equipped with four guns, were established and combined into three Coastal Artillery battalions. The gun was phased out in conjunction with the disbandment of the Coastal Artillery in the year 2000, and the last units were disbanded in November 2003.

== Construction ==
The 12/80 construction was largely based on the army Haubits 77, sharing the same carriage with auxiliary power unit to make it self-propelled for tactical movement. Even the barrel had similar external dimensions, although the coastal artillery gun had a 12 cm calibre compared to the howitzer's 15,5 cm. The 12/80 utilized 12 cm ammunition with unitary charges, an automatic loading system on the right carriage leg that enabled a high rate of fire, and a gun computer that allowed remote targeting from radar stations and other sources. The maximum range for the 12/80 was 32 km, and the maximum firing rate was 16 rounds per minute. Interestingly the 12/80 guns were painted solid green and not using pattern-painted camouflage use on most Haubits 77 guns.

== See also ==
- 12 cm tornautomatpjäs m/70
