= Ashok Leyland Defence Systems =

Indian defence contractor

Ashok Leyland Defence Systems Limited
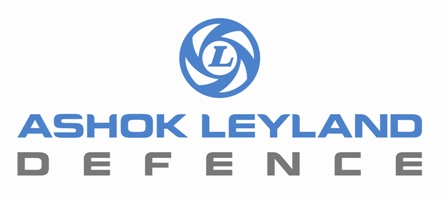
- Company type: Public
- Industry: Military
- Founded: 18 March 2008; 18 years ago
- Headquarters: Chennai, Tamil Nadu, India
- Key people: Amandeep Singh (Head Defence), Ratan Shrivastava (Exports)
- Products: Military Vehicles; Engines
- Parent: Ashok Leyland, Hinduja Group
- Website: Ashok Leyland Defence - Home

Ashok Leyland Defence Systems is a Hinduja Group company involved in manufacturing military trucks such as the widely used Stallion troop carriers.

== History ==
Ashok Leyland Defence Systems was floated on 18 March 2008. Hinduja Group's flagship company Ashok Leyland holds 26 percent in the newly formed company. Ashok Leyland has been involved in the design, development and manufacture of vehicles for the Indian armed forces. Ashok Leyland is ranked among the world's largest producers of medium duty defence vehicles today.

Ashok Leyland's defence vehicles are serving armed forces in ground support roles from troop carriers to special application logistical and tactical vehicles. Its diesel engines have been used to power vehicles, boats, cranes, ground starter aggregates, compressors and generators.

Ashok Leyland has supported the modernization of the Indian Army by developing a host of logistical vehicles with military payloads ranging from 1.5 to 16 tonnes for Light Specialty Vehicles (LSV), Mine Protected Vehicles (MPV), General Services Role, Light Recovery Vehicles, High Mobility Vehicles, Fire Fighting Trucks, Field Artillery Tractors and other special applications.

Ashok Leyland Defence has a rich heritage of association with defence forces around the world through its association with Leyland and AVIA. The Mk VIII Centaur tanks which were built at Leyland taking part in the Italian campaign in 1943. While the OT 64 Czech armoured carrier's chassis units were manufactured by AVIA in 1963.

== Operations ==
=== India ===
Ashok Leyland has extended its automotive expertise to the defence sector, for over three decades, and has been a pioneer in the design, development and manufacture of special vehicles, serving the Indian Army. Ashok Leyland Defence Systems Ltd. (ALDS) shares this heritage and association with global defence markets.

=== Global ===
Ashok Leyland Defence Systems Ltd. (ALDS) also leverages Ashok Leyland's in-house R&D base, its collaboration with global technology leaders and Ashok Leyland's state-of-the-art plants in India. Ashok Leyland Defence Systems Ltd. (ALDS) also works with associate companies (Hinduja Group Companies) AVIA (Prague, Czech Republic), Optare (Leeds, UK), Defiance (Detroit, USA), Hinduja Foundries (Chennai, India) and AlbonAir (Dortmund, Germany) to leverage their capabilities.

== Products ==
They have logistical vehicles with military payloads ranging from 1.5 to 16 tonnes for Light Specialty Vehicles (LSV), Mine Protected Vehicles (MPV), General Services Role, Light Recovery Vehicles, High Mobility Vehicles, Fire Fighting Trucks, Field Artillery Tractors and other special applications. It also has tactical vehicles designed for combat and offensive roles such as Multi-Barrel Rocket Launchers (MBRLs).

=== Stallion ===
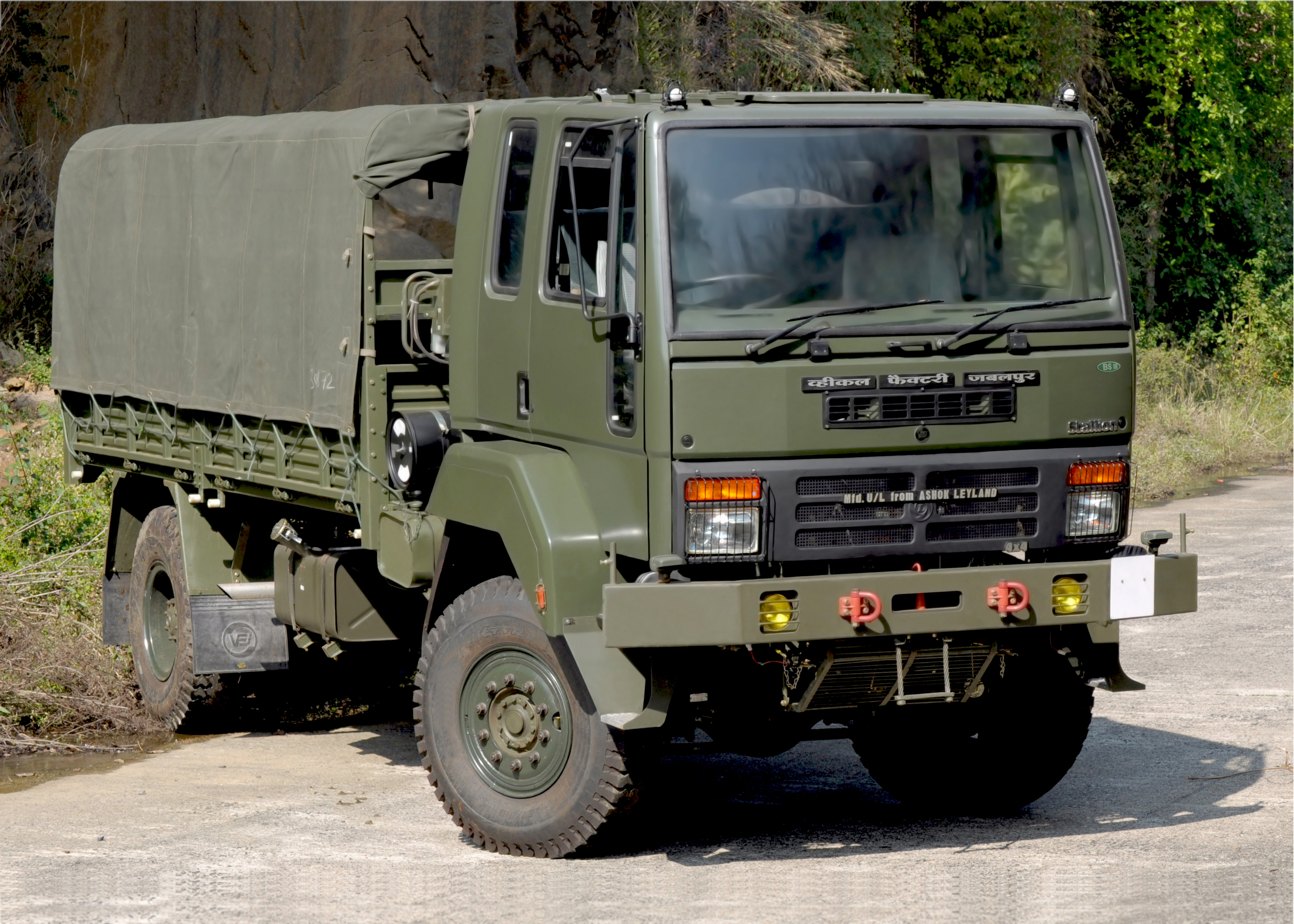
Vehicle Factory Jabalpur (VFJ)'s Stallion 4X4 Truck for the Indian Army

The Stallion is a medium duty defence vehicle with multiple logistical, tactical and special purpose applications. The Stallion 4x4 and Stallion 6x6 are operation across climatic zones such as Alpine, Subtropical, Tropical and Arid zones. The Stallion is used by the Indian Army across the varied climate and terrain of India from coastal operations to high altitude bases, from deserts to snow covered mountainous regions. The Stallion forms the logistical backbone of the Indian Armed Forces with over 60,000 Stallions used by the Indian Army, all manufactured at the Vehicle Factory Jabalpur. The Stallion is built for use in harsh environments and for easy maintenance in regions where supporting infrastructure may be missing. The Sri Lanka Army also uses Stallions.

==== Super Stallion ====
The Super Stallion is an uprated version of the Stallion. The 6x6 is rated at 10 tonnes while the 8x8 is rated at 12 tonnes.

=== Rhino ===
Rhino is a medium to heavy duty defence vehicle with logistical and tactical applications.

=== Fox ===
Fox is a light specialist defence vehicle with logistical and tactical applications.

=== Special Purpose Vehicles ===
Special Purpose Vehicles for military applications such as armoured bus transport, fire appliance and mine protected vehicles.

=== End-to-End Logistical Defence Solution ===
Ashok Leyland Defence Systems (ALDS) provides an end-to-end logistical defence solution with the Stallion 4x4 and Stallion 6x6. The End-to-End Defence Vehicle Solutions include modular packages such as Fleet Management System, vehicle maintenance kits, driver training packages, electronic publications along with global warehouse support.

== Strategic Partnerships ==
Krauss-Maffei Wegmann

Hinduja Group's floated Ashok Leyland Defence Systems Ltd (ALDS) (floated on 18 March 2008), India and Krauss-Maffei Wegmann (KMW) GmbH and Co KG, Germany, jointly develop advanced defence systems for Indian defence establishment as well as other defence forces worldwide. The memorandum of understanding (MoU) signed between the companies, includes scope in development of artillery systems, combat systems, armoured wheeled vehicles, recovery vehicles, bridge laying systems and other similar products. Dr V. Sumantran, Chairman, Ashok Leyland Defence Systems, said the partnership brings together the technological bandwidth of KMW and Ashok Leyland's innovations aimed at cost advantage and expands ALDS' product opportunities. Mr Frank Haun, CEO and President, KMW, said the partnership will support KMW's plans to internationalise its business.

Paramount Group

Ashok Leyland Defence Systems (ALDS) has signed up with the Paramount Group, South Africa for the development and manufacture of Mine Protected Vehicles in India. Initially basic components manufactured in South Africa would be used to assemble the vehicles in India before the production line there starts making all components. The new vehicle combines the specification of two Paramount mine-resistant vehicles, the Marauder and the Matador, with the Ashok Leyland's basic four-wheel drive military vehicle Stallion.
