= Haubits FH77 =

Swedish 155 mm towed howitzer

Haubits FH77/A
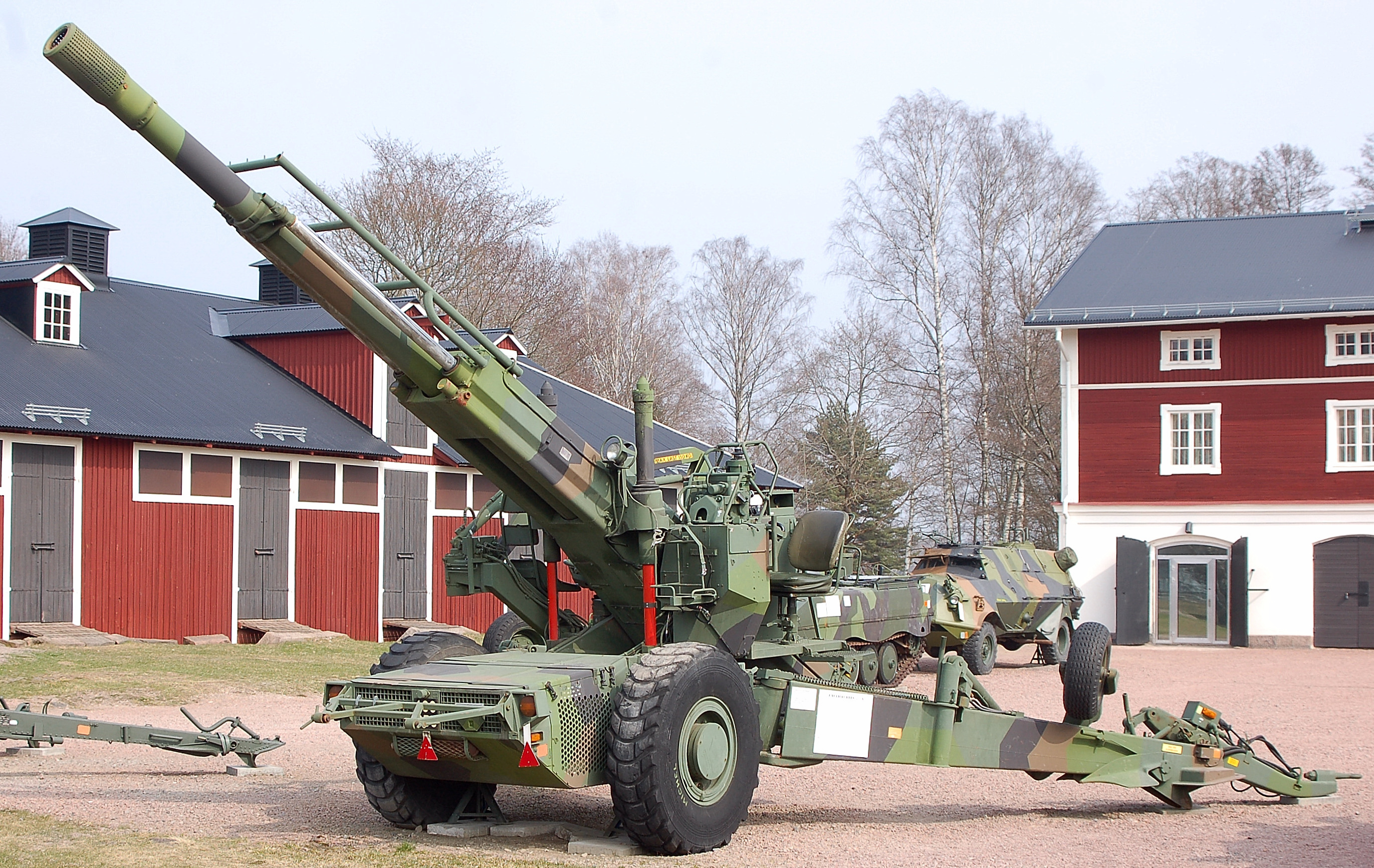
- The Haubits FH77/A
- Type: Howitzer
- Place of origin: Sweden

Service history
- In service: 1978 – present
- Used by: Operators
- Wars: Kargil War

Production history
- Designer: Bofors
- Designed: 1978
- Manufacturer: Bofors
- Unit cost: $695,000 (1986)
- Produced: 1978–1984
- No. built: 720
- Variants: See Variants

Specifications
- Mass: 11,500 kg (25,400 lb)
- Length: Combat: 11.60 m (38 ft 1 in)
- Barrel length: 5.89 m (19 ft 4 in) L/38
- Width: Combat: 9.73 m (31 ft 11 in)
- Crew: 9 to 14
- Shell: 155 mm NATO
- Caliber: 155 mm
- Action: semi-fixed ammunition, propellant charge is contained in a plastic cartridge case with a steel head
- Breech: Vertically sliding breech block, hydraulic ramming
- Carriage: split trail with castor wheels
- Elevation: -5°/+70°
- Traverse: 30° left or right from centreline
- Rate of fire: 4 rounds in 9 seconds, 6 rounds in 25 seconds, sustained 3 revolutions per minute for 20 minutes
- Muzzle velocity: 300 to 770 m/s (980 to 2,530 ft/s)
- Effective firing range: 21 km (13 mi)
- Maximum firing range: 24 km (15 mi) (with base bleed-round); 60 km+ (using ramjet-round)
- Feed system: hydraulically powered flick rammer assisted loading
- Engine: Volvo B20 APU
- Maximum speed: 6 km/h

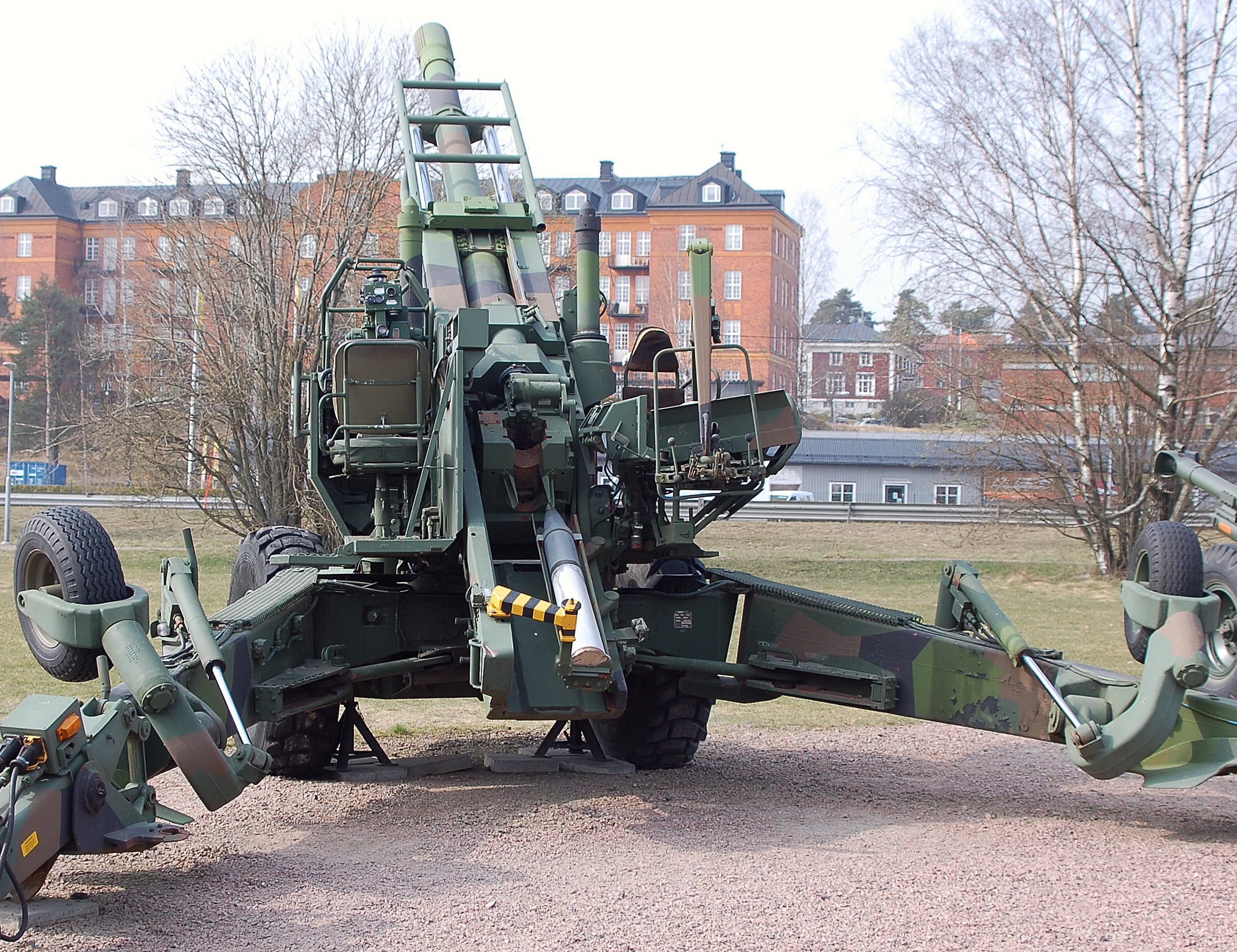
Haubits FH77/A with its vertical sliding block breech and a round visible

Fälthaubits 77 (transl. Field Howitzer 77) or FH77 is a Swedish 155 mm howitzer, developed and manufactured by Bofors. It is also colloquially known as the Bofors gun in India. There were several versions, the original (sometimes referred to as Haubits 77 A) with a 38 calibre barrel and sliding block mechanism, the export version FH77 B version with a 39 calibre barrel and an interrupted ogival screw breech. For the demonstrator of the Archer Artillery System, some FH77A were modified into FH 77 AD L/45, while the series production were FH77Bs rebuilt into FH77 BW L/52. The carriage was also used for the KARIN, used in the Swedish coastal artillery.

== Design and development ==
=== History ===
In the 1960s, Sweden started to look for a replacement for the French Obusier de 155 mm Modèle 50 (Haubits F). The American M109 self-propelled howitzer was offered and tested. Though the price was low, the Swedish Arms Administration found that the high maintenance costs, the low rate of fire and the limited mobility of the M109 made it worth the effort to develop a domestic howitzer.

The requirements for a new gun would be:

- High mobility.
- High momentary rate of fire.

The result was a compromise between a more expensive self-propelled howitzer and a less mobile conventional towed howitzer.

The FH77 was the first field howitzer featuring an auxiliary power unit to make it self-propelled for tactical movement.

The rate of fire was, at the time, exceptionally high for a 155 mm howitzer. The FH77A (which uses semi-fixed ammunition) could fire 4 rounds in 9 seconds, or 6 rounds in 25 seconds. In a sustained firing role, it could fire 6 rounds every two minutes for 20 minutes (i.e. 3 rounds per minute).

In order to use standard NATO ammunition, the FH77B was developed. While the vertical sliding-block worked well with the cased charges (propellant enclosed in a mostly plastic case with steel base) acting as a seal, it was decided that bagged charges required an interrupted screw breech. This, combined with the slightly longer barrel, resulted in a slightly improved range but also a lower rate of fire. At the same time, the petrol-fueled auxiliary power unit was exchanged with a diesel-fueled one, allowing it to use the same fuel as the towing vehicle.

=== Driving and deploying ===
The dedicated towing vehicle for the FH77 was the Scania SBA111 (Tgb 40). The truck was equipped with a crew compartment behind the driving cab and a HIAB-crane for ammunition handling. The howitzer's auxiliary power unit can be started and controlled by the driver of the towing vehicle to give an extra boost during off-road driving. The maximum towing speed is 70 km/h (45 mph).

The FH77 is manoeuvred by the gun layer, controlling the torque of the two main wheels through a joystick. Speed is regulated by changing the auxiliary power unit's revolutions per minute. The howitzer is deployed by spreading the trail legs, raising the castor wheels and driving the howitzer in reverse to anchor the recoil spades.

=== Auxiliary power unit ===
The FH77A is powered by a Volvo B20 auxiliary power unit, which gives the gun a top speed of 7 km/h. The engine is connected to three hydraulic pumps, of which two are linked to the wheels and one is used for a traverse, elevation, ramming and ammunition crane. The fuel tank could hold 40 litres, with two extra 20 litre jerry-cans as a reserve in front of the gun layer's position. The FH77B has the same configuration, but is powered by a Mercedes-Benz diesel engine.

=== Crew ===
The crew consists of 10–14 men. The minimum crew setup would be 4 men; commander, gun layer, loader 1 and loader 2.

- The commander directs all the activity of the crew from a platform to the left of the gun layer.
- The layer sits on the left hand side of the gun, operating the fire control computer and driving the howitzer when in self-deployment mode.
- Loader 1 is located to the right hand side of the gun and is in charge of supplying the shells from the loading table in front of him.
- Loader 2 and 3 would be working on the ground, providing shells to loader 1 by means of a hydraulic crane and loading cases in the loading trough.
- Loader 3 is normally the driver of the towing vehicle.

=== Ammunition ===
The FH77A uses the m/77 (42 kg) 155mm HE shell combined with a plastic casing, containing six propellant charge increments.

The FH77B uses standard NATO 155mm ammunition with bagged drive charges.

Both are able to use base bleed ammunition developed for the FH77B, as well as Bofors 155 Bonus cluster round and M982 Excalibur guided round.

==== Ramjet Propelled Artillery Shell ====
IIT Madras along with IIT Kanpur, Armament Research and Development Establishment (ARDE) and Research Centre Imarat (RCI) are working on redesigning an existing 155 mm shell using ramjet propulsion that can cover 60 km+ range. The shell will use precision guidance kit for trajectory correction. IIT Madras is ensuring that Munitions India can manufacture the shells.

==== 155 mm Smart Artillery Shell ====
IIT Madras is working with Munitions India to develop 155 mm Smart Artillery Shells with a CEP of less than 10 meters that are compatible with firing from Haubits FH77 without the need for modification. Utilizing fin stabilization, canard control, and a three-mode fuse operation, the shell will be guided by NavIC satellites. Its range will be 8 km at minimum and 38 km at maximum.

=== Controversy in India ===
The Bofors scandal was a major political scandal that occurred between Sweden and India during 1980s and 1990s, initiated by Congress politicians and implicating the Indian prime minister, Rajiv Gandhi, and several other members of the Swedish and Indian governments, who were accused of receiving kickbacks from Bofors AB for winning a bid to supply India's 155 mm field howitzer.

This resulted in India not exercising the option for 48 additional FH77B, instead these guns were acquired by the Swedish army and have now been converted into the Archer Artillery System.

== Variants ==
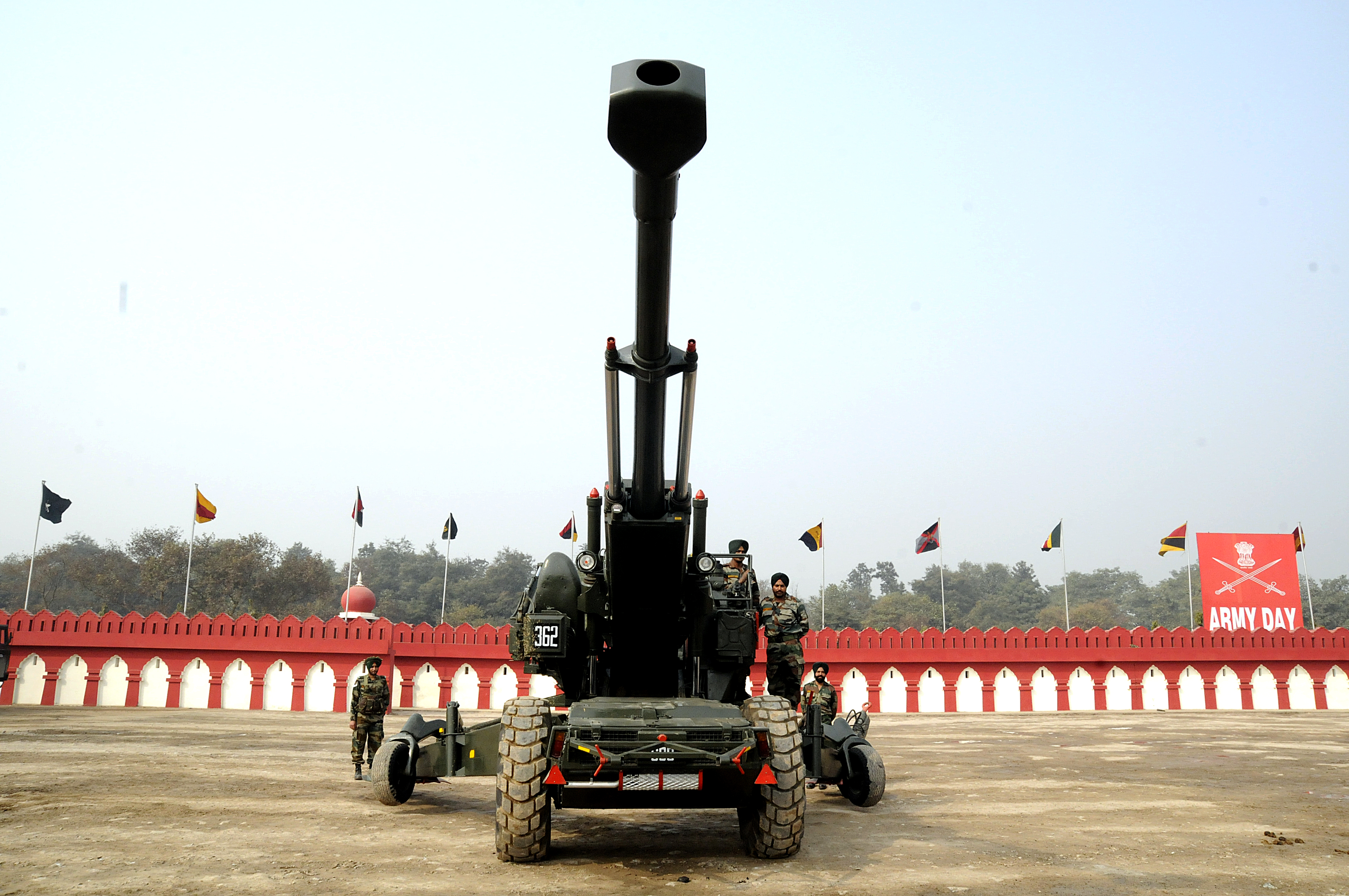
Haubits FH77/B of the Indian Army

=== Towed variant ===
- FH77 A – original baseline version with the Volvo B20A petrol engine and 38-caliber barrel.
- FH77 B – export version with a Mercedes-Benz OM-616.918 diesel engine, 39-caliber barrel and lower rate of fire as a result of a modified breech block to use NATO-compatible ammunition.

=== Vehicle-mounted variant ===
- Archer Artillery System – self-propelled FH77B-version with a 52 calibre gun mounted on the chassis of a Volvo articulated hauler.

== Operators ==
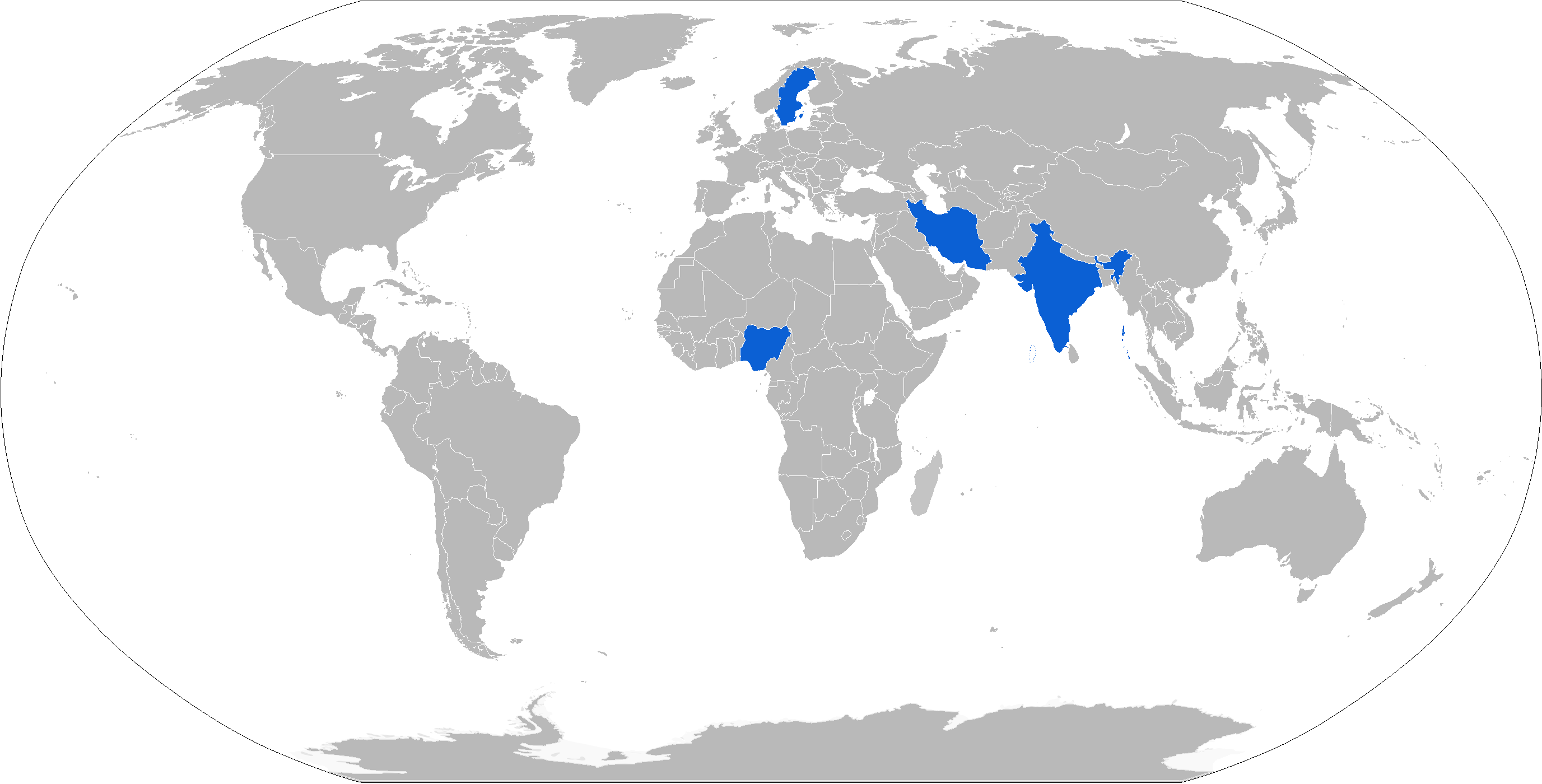
Map with FH77 operators in blue

- Sweden – Approximately 220 FH77 delivered to the Swedish Army between 1979 and 1984.
- Nigeria – 48 FH77B purchased in 1980.
- India – 410 acquired from 1986–1991. 200 left in service. An improved howitzer named Dhanush was developed after studying this gun and released in 2019. It is a 45 caliber gun and has a range of 38 km apart from other modernization like ballistic calculations, inbuilt gun-control-computer, sighting etc.
