= Scania SBA111 =

Swedish all-wheel drive truck

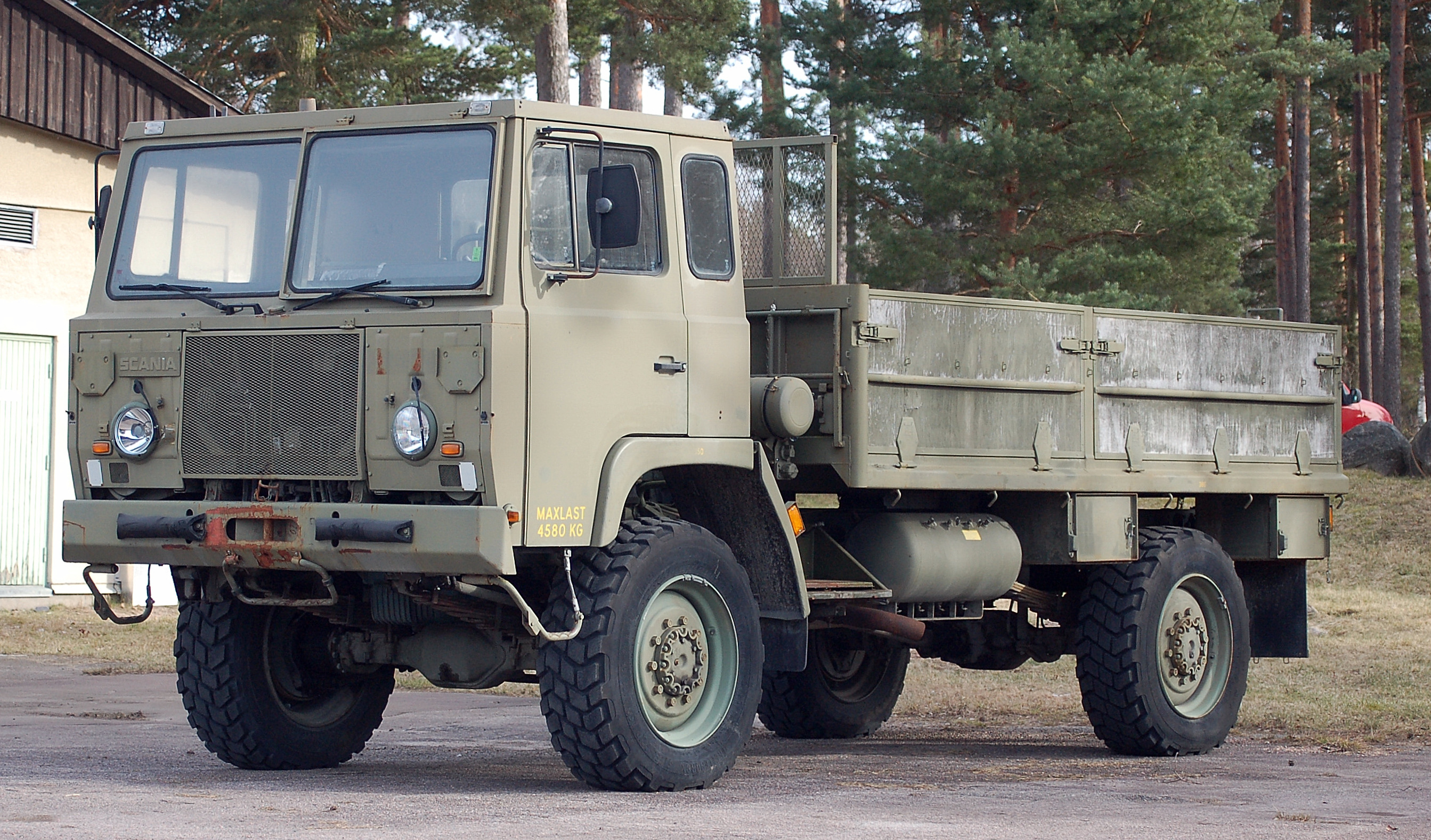

Overview
- Manufacturer: Scania division from Saab-Scania
- Also called: Tgb 30
- Production: 1975 - 1981

Powertrain
- Engine: Scania D11 162 kW (220 hp)
- Transmission: Scania GA763

Dimensions
- Wheelbase: 4.0 m
- Length: 6.75 m
- Width: 2.5 m
- Height: 2.9 m
- Curb weight: 8,820 kg

Scania SBAT111S
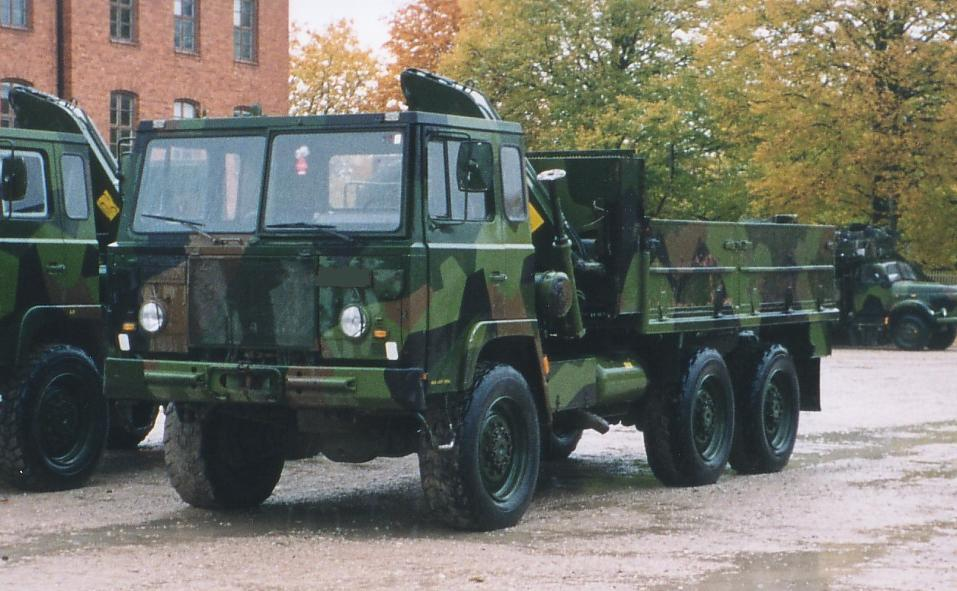

Overview
- Manufacturer: Scania division from Saab-Scania
- Also called: Tgb 40, Tgb 45
- Production: 1975 - 1981 1987 - 1990

Powertrain
- Engine: Scania DS11(turbocharged) 221 kW (300 hp)
- Transmission: Scania GA763

Dimensions
- Wheelbase: 3.5 + 1.5 m
- Length: 7.75 m
- Width: 2.5 m
- Height: 2.9 m
- Curb weight: 11,200 kg

The Scania SBA111, designated Terrängbil 30 (Tgb 30), is a military all-wheel drive cross-country truck designed and manufactured by Scania division of Saab-Scania for the Swedish Armed Forces. Full name is Special Bulldog Allwheeldrive, generation 1, 11-liter diesel engine.

Scania SBAT111S designated Terrängbil 40 (Tgb 40) is a larger version, sporting three-axle, all-wheel drive. Full name is Special Bulldog Allwheeldrive Tandem, generation 1, 11 liter Supercharged dieselengine.

Tests begun in 1971, and Scania was rewarded a SEK 1500 million order in 1975. About 1700 SBA111 and 800 SBAT111S were delivered to the army, air force and navy, by 1981, when production stopped, but was restarted in 1986 after an Indian order.

On Tgb 40s used for towing the 12-ton 155mm Bofors field howitzer FH 77, the APU of the self-propelled howitzer can be operated by the truck driver with a control unit to the left of the driver's seat to add traction on difficult cross country passages. Few of such units were ordered by Indian army with Bofors field howitzer FH77.

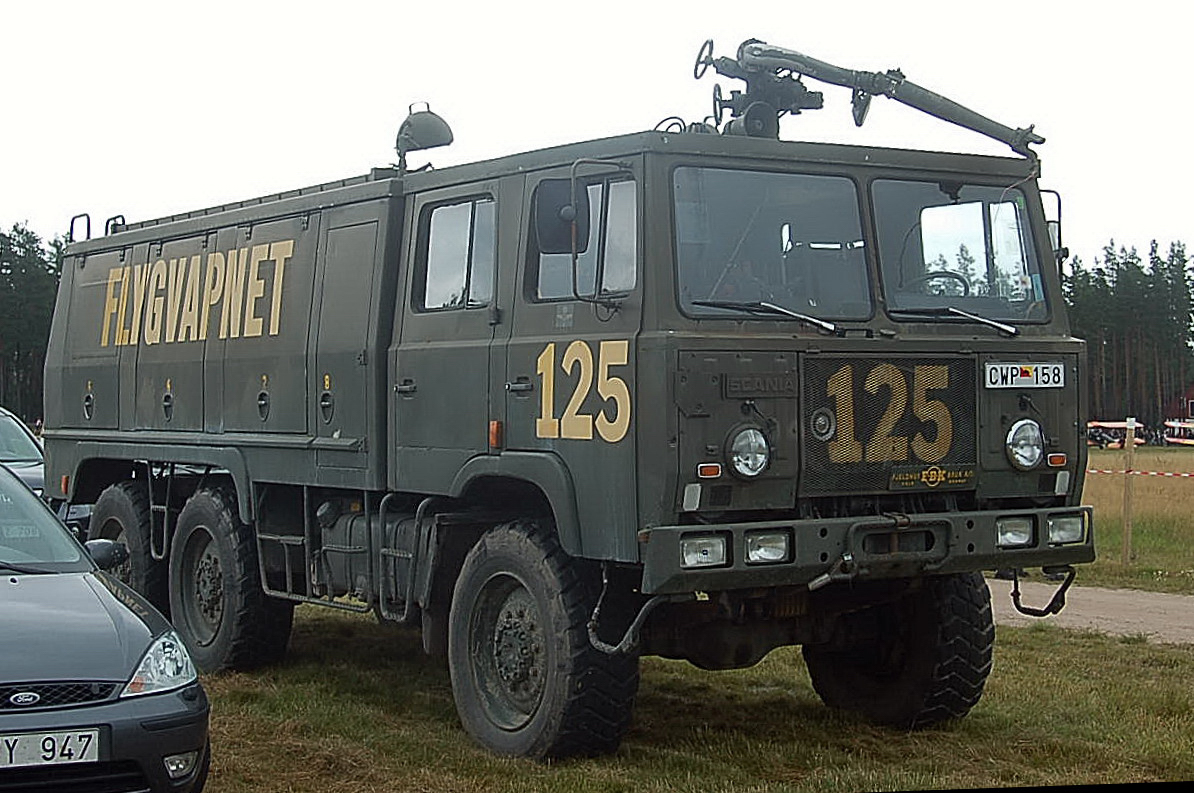
Räddningsterrängbil 4112

The Swedish Air Force operates 50 SBAT111S as airport crash tenders with designation Räddningsterrängbil 4112 (Rescue terrain-car 4112). The airforce also uses 80 SBA111 with double-cabin with three steering wheels in a special snow blower version, fitted with a Scania 258-kW (350 hp) DS14 V8 diesel engine to power the Rollba snow blower. The capacity is approx. 30 tons/minute of snow thrown 30 meters.

The SBA111 is a forward control truck with a 6-cylinder Scania diesel engine, a six-shift Scania automatic gearbox integrated with a mechanical two-shift transfer case driving all axles, the winch and optional two other power-take-offs. Due to ample ground clearance, low centre of gravity, locking differentials on all axles and automatic transmission, it has very good cross-country mobility. It is fitted with an 87 kN winch.

Beside having one more axle and a larger capacity than the SBA111, the SBAT111S has a turbocharged engine, a 100-kN winch and a power take-off when a 55-kNm hydraulic crane is fitted or other hydraulic operated units.

There was limited export to Finland. The SBAT111S was thoroughly tested by Australia, United States and Canada, but no purchases were made mainly due to political reasons. Small numbers of trucks were sold to China, Libya, Mozambique, Iceland, Iraq, India and some other countries. The Egyptian army also ordered 590 units in the late 1980s.

When India purchased 410 FH77B Bofors howitzers in 1986, they also ordered 660 SBAT111S that were modified for the Indian Army with reinforced suspension and brakes to carry 8.5 tonnes on road and in terrain. The Swedish Army then purchased 83 units of the improved SBAT111S and adopted them as Terrängbil 45 (Tgb 45).

== Civilian use ==
For civilian purposes, certain trucks were sold when extreme cross-country mobility was required. They were equipped for fire-fighting, sewer-emptying, sky-lifting, high-lifting loading-cranes, water and oil-drilling and as recovery vehicles.
