= Ashok Leyland Stallion =

Range of trucks produced for the Indian Army

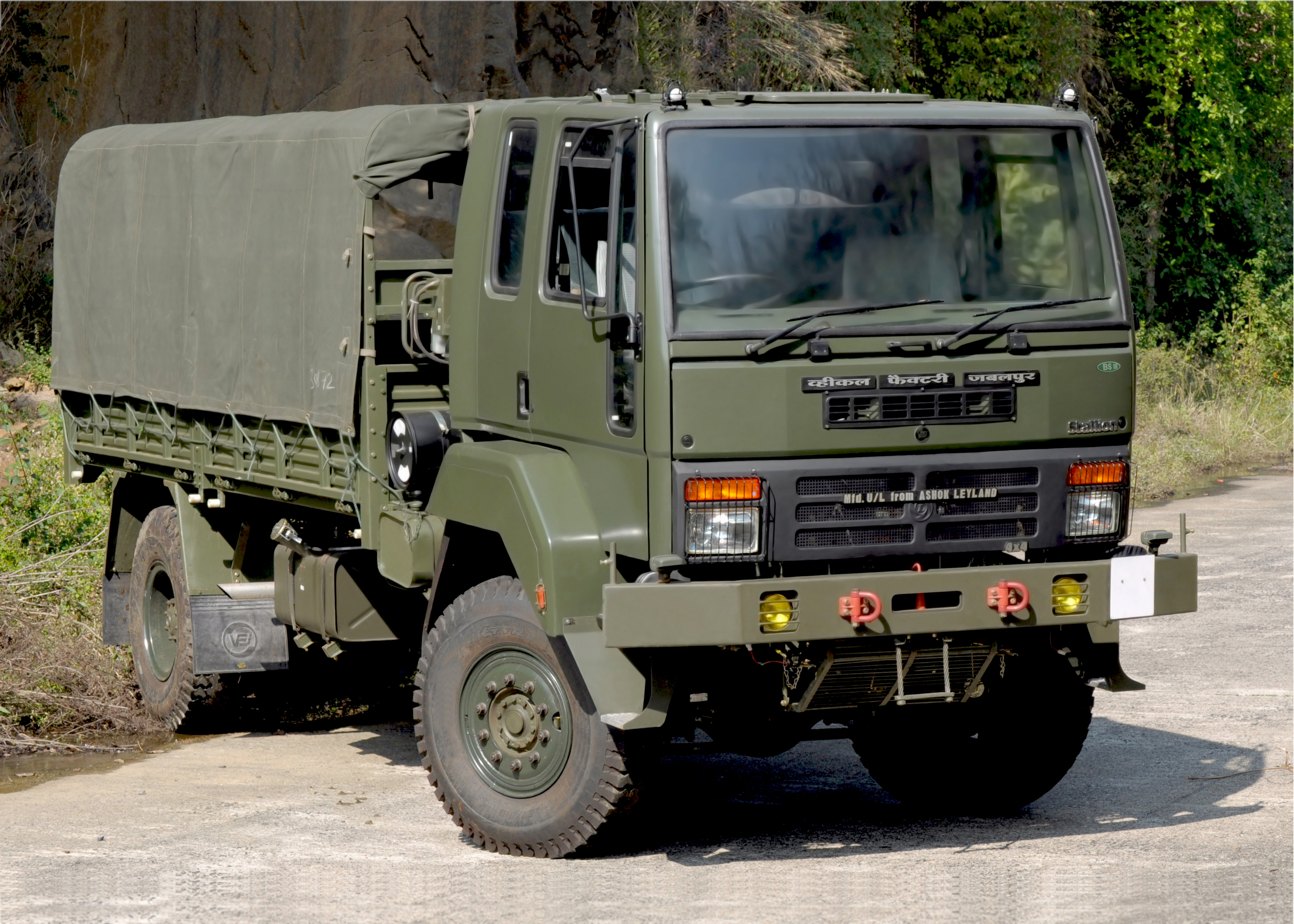
Vehicle Factory Jabalpur (VFJ)'s Stallion 4X4 Truck for the Indian Army

The Stallion range of trucks is produced by Vehicle Factory Jabalpur (VFJ) of Armoured Vehicles Nigam Limited (previously Ordnance Factory Board) for the Indian Armed Forces.

The Stallion forms the logistical backbone of the Indian Armed Forces, with over 60,000 Stallions used by the Indian Army and several thousand are used by ITBP. Stallions in a wide range of configurations were in active service with the Indian Army as of 2010. The Stallions have replaced the erstwhile workhorses of the Armed Forces, the Shaktiman trucks, which has been phased out.

== History ==
On 10 August 1998, a license was granted by Ashok Leyland to produce the Stallion Mk III variant at Vehicle Factory Jabalpur.

In February 2005, Ashok Leyland began to market the Stallion in Africa and the Middle East.

In August 2006, a report from the Parliament of the United Kingdom indicated the Stallions were sold to the Sudanese government, supplied to GIAD Automotive Industry Co through kits. Said report raised concerns of British involvement in the sale as some British nationals were listed as Ashok Leyland's board of directors without acquiring a Trade and Brokerage Licence.

== Design ==
VFJ Stallion Mk III

The Stallion is designed for reliability, high mobility, off-road tactical capabilities, protection, and for operation in challenging environments. It is engineered for easy maintenance, particularly in areas lacking supporting infrastructure.

It is a medium-duty defence vehicle of the Indian Army with multiple logistical and tactical applications. The Stallion 4x4 and Stallion 6x6 are operational on varied terrains, from coastal operations to high-altitude bases, from deserts to snow-covered mountainous regions, at altitudes up to 5,500 metres (18,000 ft) and temperatures ranging from −35 to 55 °C (−31 to 131 °F).

=== Vehicle configurations ===
The Stallion range offers various driveline configurations and standard bodies for each configuration. All base variants are available in right hand drive or left hand drive, manual or automatic transmission and armoured or non-armoured cabins. Ashok Leyland Defence also offers Stallion kits to various manufacturers who sell armoured vehicles and Mine Protected Vehicles (MPV).

The standard troop carrying/cargo-type platform body is fitted with steel drop sides, a single-piece drop tailgate, and a removable tarpaulin and bows. An optional feature includes a torsion-free body.

The Stallion chassis has been adapted into a wide range of variants, including: Troop Carrier with Armoured Cab, Troop Carrier, Troop Carrier with Crane, Fuel Bowser, Water Bowser, Recovery Vehicle, ISO Container / Twist Locks, Fire Fighting Trucks, Tipper, MPV Kits.

== Variants ==
=== Super Stallion ===
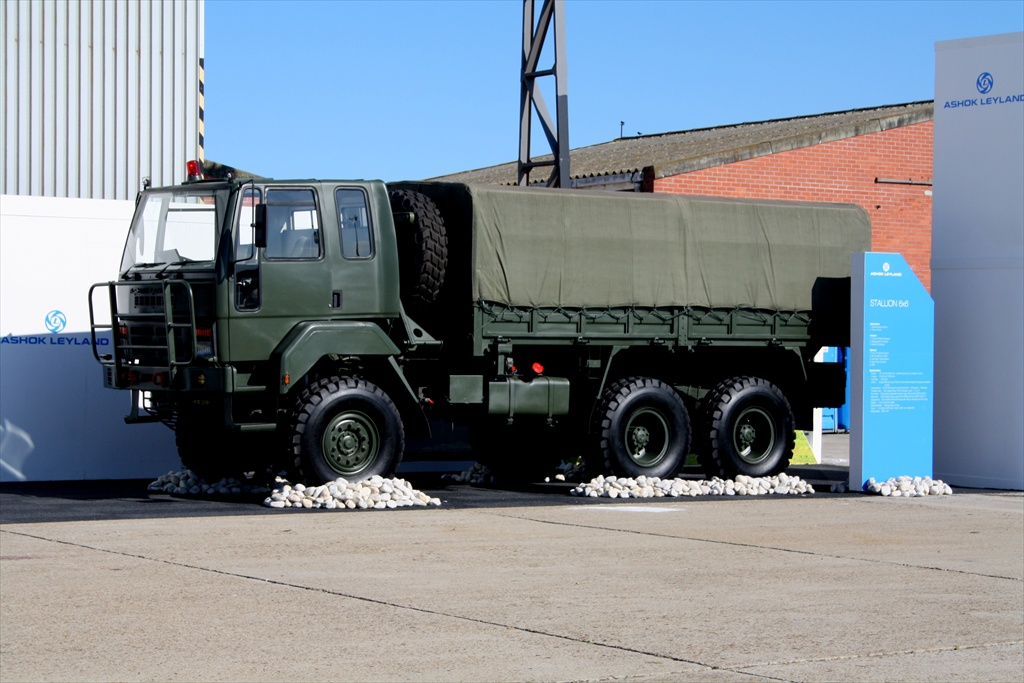
Ashok Leyland Super Stallion 6X6.

The Super Stallion is an upgraded version of the Stallion. The 6x6 is rated at 10 tonnes while the 8x8 is rated at 12 tonnes. Chassis used for mounting upgraded ERR 122 BM-21 Grad MBRL by Larsen & Toubro for the Indian Army.

=== Stallion Kavach ===
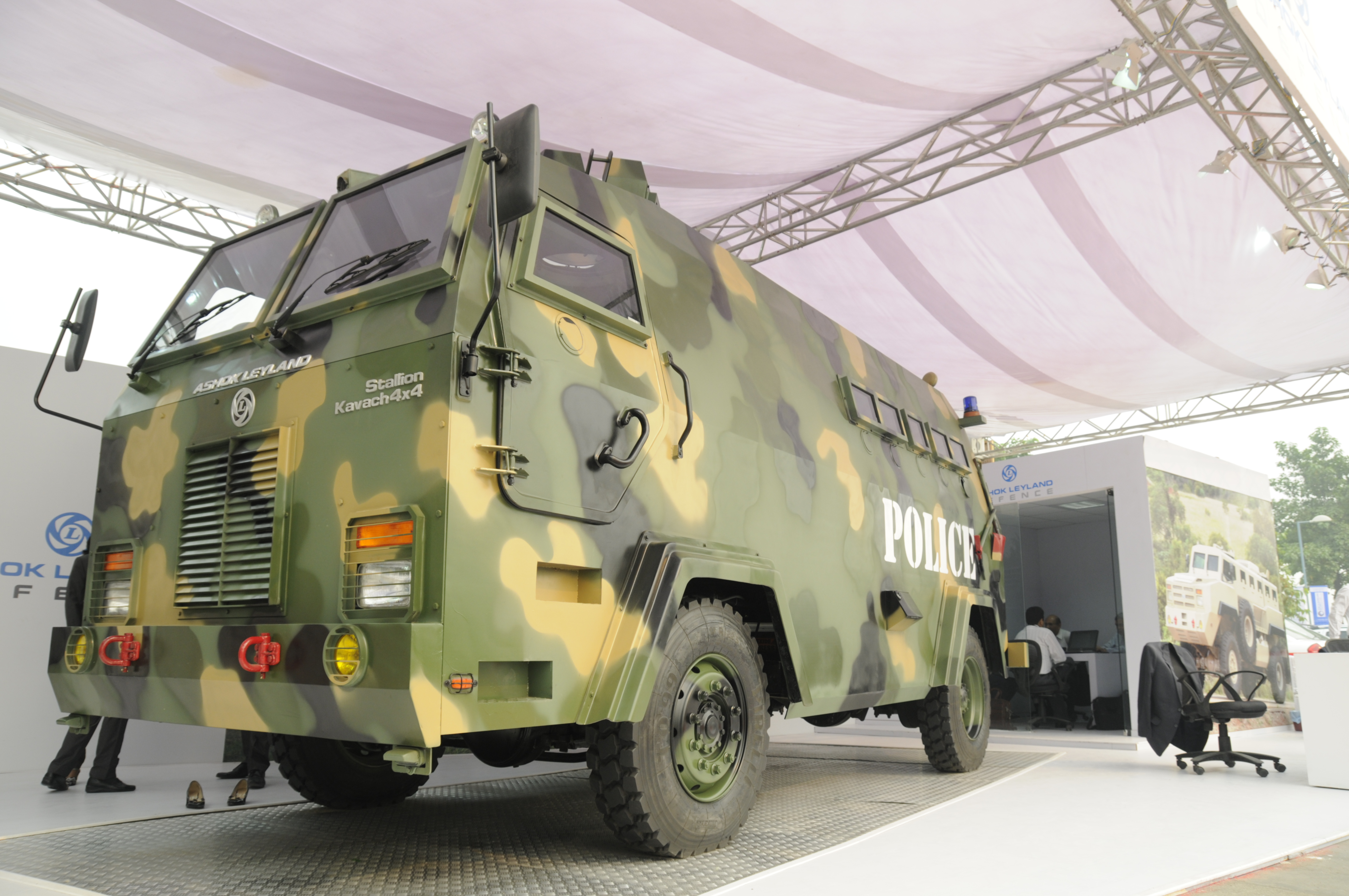
Stallion-based Kavach armored personnel carrier

Ashok Leyland has developed an armored personnel carrier of the 4x4 Stallion.

=== Field Artillery Tractor ===
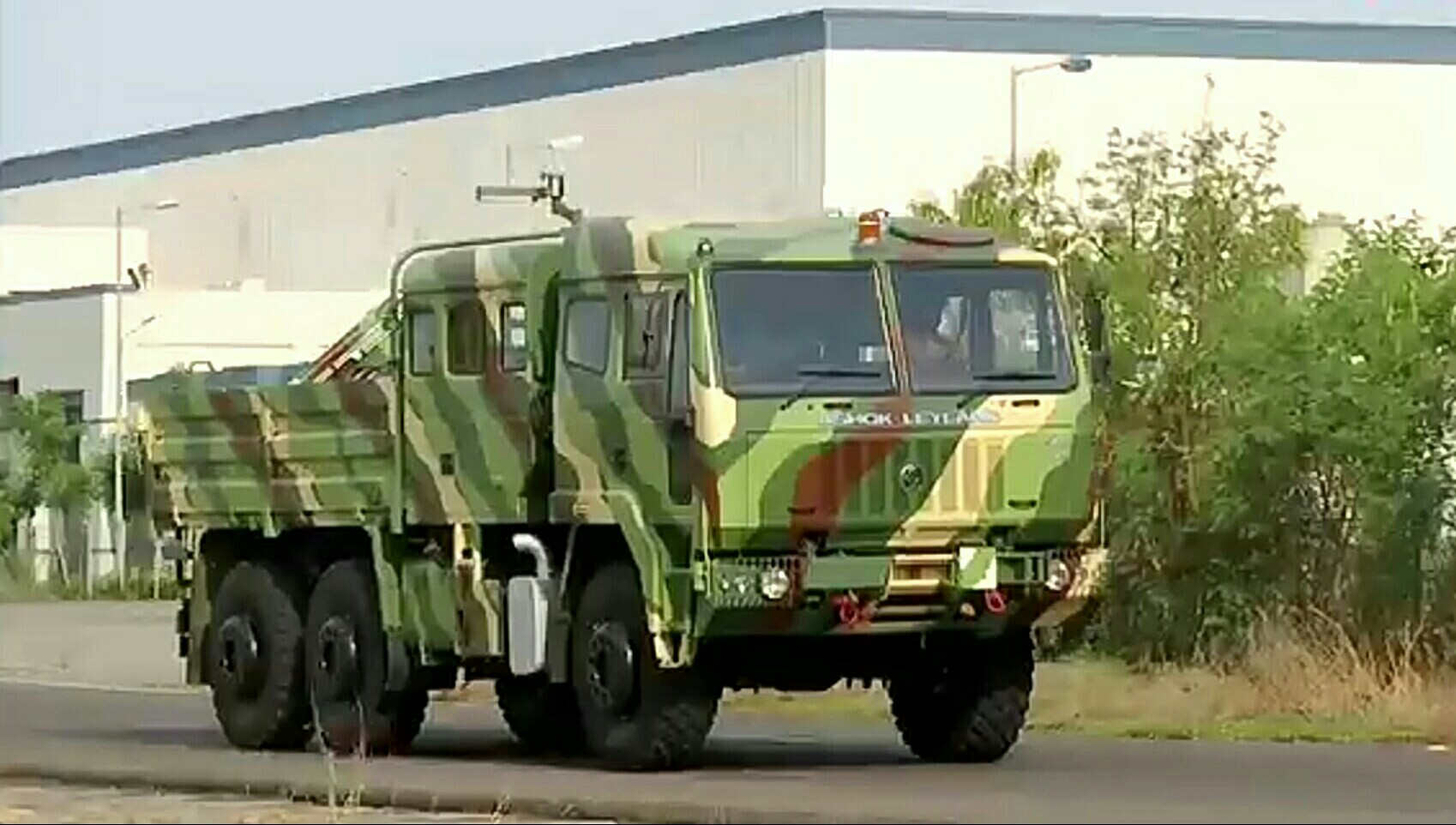
Ashok Leyland FAT 6x6.

Field Artillery Tractor is a variant developed for towing heavy artillery guns on 4×4 and 6×6 platform.

=== Foreign Variants ===
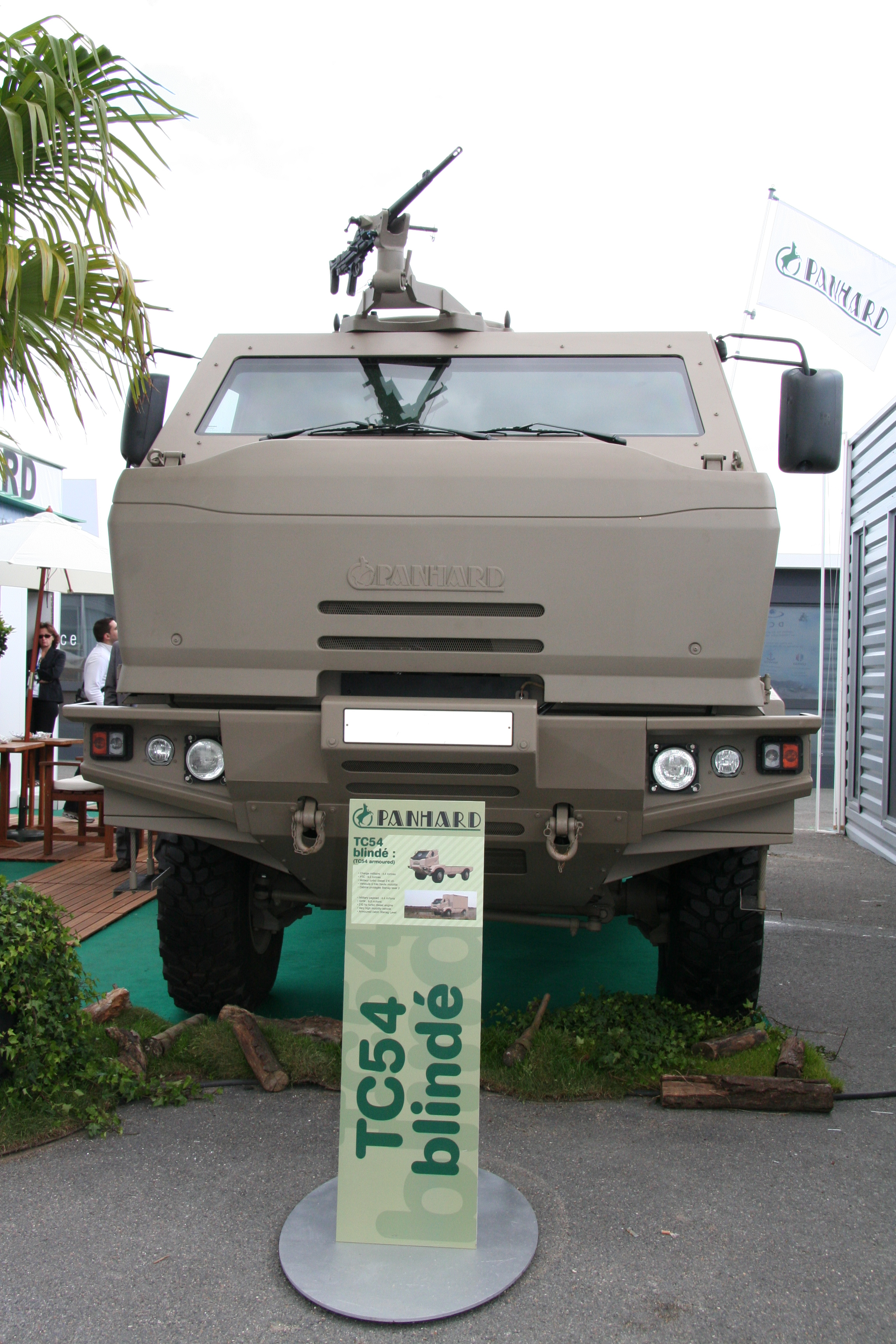
Panhard TC54 with an armored cab.

The Panhard TC54 is an Ashok Leyland Stallion, but with an Austrian Steyr diesel engine and a Czech transmission built for a Saudi-Chinese 155mm towed artillery programme. It was first developed in 2008.

== Operators ==
=== Ashok Leyland Stallion ===
- Honduras - 139
- India - 70,000+
- Sudan - 100 sold through kits, assembled by GIAD.
- Thailand - unknown number of Stallion 6x6
- Ukraine - one acquired in October 2022.
- Zimbabwe - 633

=== Panhard TC54 ===
- Saudi Arabia - 50 Panhard TC54s.
- Togo 80 Panhard TC54s.
