= Dhanush (howitzer) =

Indian 155 mm (L/45 & L/52) howitzer

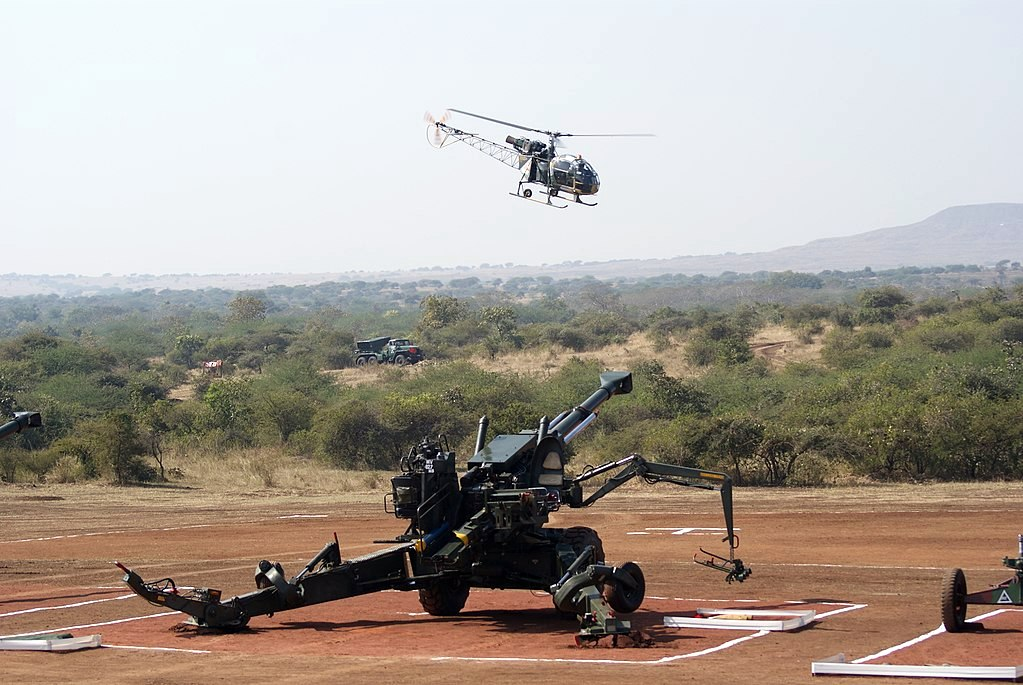
- The Dhanush in public display.
- Type: Howitzer
- Place of origin: India

Service history
- In service: 2019 - present
- Used by: Indian Army
- Wars: 2025 India–Pakistan conflict

Production history
- Designer: Ordnance Factory Board
- Designed: 2010 - 2013
- Manufacturer: Advanced Weapons and Equipment India Limited (previously Ordnance Factory Board)
- Unit cost: ₹14 crore (US$1.5 million)
- Produced: 2014 - present
- No. built: >72 (excl. 12 prototypes)

Specifications
- Mass: 13 tonnes (13 long tons; 14 short tons)(L/45); <14 tonnes (14 long tons; 15 short tons) (L/52)
- Barrel length: 6.98 metres (22.9 feet) L/45; 8.06 metres (26.4 feet) L/52 (Upgraded)
- Crew: 6-8
- Caliber: 155 mm (NATO ammunition compatible)
- Action: Auto gun alignment and positioning
- Breech: Screw type
- Recoil: Electro-rheological/Magneto-rheological
- Elevation: Servo based, -3°/+70°
- Traverse: Servo based, 30° left or right from centreline
- Rate of fire: Burst: 3 rounds in 15 sec; Intense: 15 rounds in 3 min; Sustained: 60 rounds in 60 min
- Maximum firing range: 38 km(L/45); 42 km (L/52); >60 km (for Ramjet Shell)
- Feed system: Electrically operated ammunition handling
- Sights: Thermal sight Gunners display

Dhanush (lit. 'Bow') is a 155 mm towed, long-range, medium howitzer manufactured by Advanced Weapons and Equipment India at Gun Carriage Factory Jabalpur, previously a part of the Ordnance Factory Board (OFB). The gun was approved for series production in 2019 and has been inducted into the Indian Army. The Dhanush project was started by OFB to replace the older 105 mm Indian Field Gun, 105 mm Light Field Gun and the Russian 122 mm guns with a modern 155 mm artillery gun.

== Development ==
The initial indigenous development of artillery guns in India started in the 1970s with the Artillery Gun Development Team under Brigadier Gurdyal Singh at Gun Carriage Factory, Jabalpur. This resulted in the introduction of 105 mm Indian Field Gun and its variant, the Light Field Gun into the Indian Army.

The purchase of Haubits FH77 guns manufactured by Bofors in the 1980s included technology transfer to Ordnance Factory Board (OFB). After many years being unable to acquire or import foreign artillery guns due to the corruption charges, OFB developed the Dhanush gun based on the technical data package, a 12,000 page document, that was delivered parallelly with the FH77. Improvements and modernisation of the original construction included lengthening the gun barrel from 39 calibres to 45, inertial navigation-based sighting system, auto-laying facility, onboard ballistic computation and an advanced day and night direct firing system.

An order, worth ₹1,260 crore (equivalent to ₹23 billion or US$240 million in 2026), was placed with OFB around 2013 for 114 guns and 300 more planned. The guns were to be manufactured by Gun Carriage Factory Jabalpur. The gun cost was at ₹14 crore (equivalent to ₹24 crore or US$2.5 million in 2026) apiece with 80% indigenous content. Very few components like APU, electronic dial sights and a few other small items are imported.

From 6 to 30 June 2014, the gun underwent its final summer trials at Pokhran Field Firing Range. This was after the successful winter trials in Sikkim at an altitude of 3,500 metres (11,500 ft) at sub-zero temperatures. Dhanush outperformed the Bofors gun by 20 to 25 percent in parameters like range, accuracy, consistency, low and high angle of fire, and shoot-and-scoot ability. There had been a pause in trials due to a barrel burst incident in August 2013 but was later investigation reported an issue with "old ammunition with air bubbles" and no problem was found in barrel design or metallurgy. So far, around 2,000 rounds were successfully fired from the gun and the Army asked for six howitzers.

Three Dhanush guns were handed over to the Indian Army for user trials in July 2016. Battery trials, with six guns that were delivered, began in April 2017 with "another round" scheduled in June. The trials were expected to be completed by July 2017 with 18 guns entering service in 2017, 36 guns in 2018, and 60 guns in 2019, for an Indian Army order of 114 guns. Each regiment has 18 guns.

The Dhanush experienced a few problem during trials, failing on three occasions in a row in 2017. It was reported in July 2017 that the howitzer failed the last phase of testing, due to the shell hitting the muzzle brake. A redesign of the barrel by widening it was being considered to solve the issue. Later an investigation revealed the incident happened due to a defective shell. Further trials were conducted by firing about 5000 shells in the desert regions and icy glaciers of the Himalayas without any incident. In June 2018, Dhanush completed final development trials. As part of the trials, all the six guns – which formed a battery – fired 50 shells each between 2 and 6 June. Additionally, 12 prototypes were built in total, which fired 4,200 rounds during development. On 18 February 2019, the gun officially received bulk production clearance (BPC) from the Ministry of Defence (MoD). As of November 2019, the first regiment was to be raised by March 2020.

In July 2017, the Central Bureau of Investigation (CBI) filed a First Information Report (FIR) against a Delhi-based company, Sidh Sales Syndicate, and unknown officials of Gun Carriage Factory after the former was found to be supplying cheaper Chinese manufactured spare parts (bearings) labelled as "Made in Germany" for the manufacturing of Dhanush guns. The officials from GCF were said to have knowingly accepted the Chinese manufactured 'Wire Race Roller Bearings' from the private firm. The firm had won a tender-based contract worth ₹35.38 lakh (equivalent to ₹66 lakh or US$68,000 in 2026) to supply the parts with the value revised to ₹53.07 lakh (equivalent to ₹93 lakh or US$96,000 in 2026) in 2014. The investigation is still underway as of 2025.

=== Manufacturing ===
The first batch of 6 guns were officially inducted by the Army on 8 April 2019. 93 Field Regiment, first unit to be armed with this gun, had the honour to participate in the 71st Republic Day Parade and Army Day parade in 2020 with its new equipment.

A manufacturing disruption had occurred later due to the untimely procurement of a spare part needed for a sub-assembly. The production of Dhanush has restarted following a pause due to the shortage of the spare part. In FY2023–2024, Advance Weapons and Equipment India Limited (AWEIL) intends to deliver the Indian Army with further 26 units of the gun. With this, the Army will have total 50 Dhanush howitzers. Accidents such as barrel bursts and muzzle brake strikes had marred the early years of manufacturing. At that point, the Ordnance Factory Board (OFB) was in charge of the Gun Carriage Factory in Jabalpur. New terms and conditions were signed with the new entity AWEIL following the corporatization. According to the revised terms, the delivery is proceeding as planned.

Initially, the order was scheduled to be executed by 2022, which was then shifted to March 2026.

Between March 2024 and June 2025, the second regiment was raised by the Indian Army.

As of June 2025, the third regiment is being raised and few units of the unit has been delivered as well. It was also not expected that the delivery of the guns would be completed as per schedule, which is 2026.

On 27 March 2026, the Defence Acquisition Council (DAC), chaired by the Defence Minister, cleared the procurement of Dhanush Gun System. Reports had earlier indicated the Indian Army's plans to acquire 300 additional howitzers of the type to equip 15 artillery regiments.

=== Ammunition ===
==== Ramjet-Propelled Artillery Shell ====
As of February 2020, IIT Madras, in partnership with IIT Kanpur, Armament Research and Development Establishment and Research Centre Imarat, is working on redesigning an existing 155 mm shell using ramjet propulsion that can cover 60 km+ range. It will be made compatible with Haubits FH77, Dhanush, K9 Vajra-T and ATAGS. The shell will incorporate a Precision Guidance Kit for trajectory correction. IIT Madras will ensure that Munitions India can manufacture the shells. A number of technological advances have already been verified. The development team is awaiting product validation and prototyping now that the design is complete. Prototype is expected to be developed within three to four years.

The project was started in 2020 by partnering with the Army Technology Board. Early trials of a scaled down system was conducted from an IIT Madras developed 76 mm gun confirmed the fundamental idea. Internal and external ballistics were validated by subsequent testing carried out in September 2025 at the School of Artillery, which successfully demonstrated clean gun exit, stable flight, and ramjet activation.

With this approach, the range of conventional shells will be enhanced by 30–50% without losing their lethality. It was approved by the Army Technology Board. It can be retrofitted onto all the existing 155 mm artillery shells. As of December 2025, developmental tests at Pokhran Field Firing Range and IIT Madras had been successful, showing that the shell can depart the gun efficiently at wider operational zones.

By 12 January 2026, IIT Madras successfully conducted several in-house tests of the ramjet unit. The ramjet engine was incorporated into an in-service 155 mm artillery shell, replacing the traditional base bleed unit. The project is led by IIT Madras Aerospace Engineering department faculty P.A. Ramakrishna and retired Indian Army officer Lt General P R Shankar among others. Range improvements were demonstrated in trials carried out on different artillery platforms. The range in K9 Vajra-T increased from 36 km to approximately 62 km, in Dhanush, the range is from approximately 30 km to approximately 55 km, and in ATAGS, it is from approximately 40 km to nearly 70 km. A similar technology is expected to be developed for rocket artillery.

==== Smart Artillery Shell ====
The development of 155 mm Smart Ammunition for the Regiment of Artillery by Munitions India and IIT Madras was reported in February 2024. The period of development is roughly two years. The goal is to improve the accuracy and lethality of artillery shells during terminal impact. The smart shell can be launched from 155 mm 39- and 45-calibre guns, including Dhanush, ATAGS, and K9 Vajra-T. It will achieve a circular error probable (CEP) of 10 m (33 ft) against 500 m (1,600 ft) CEP for conventional shells. It requires housing of miniaturize electronics and sensors package with a guidance, navigation, and control system. To improve accuracy, the smart artillery round will use NavIC, with a GPS backup. It will be interoperable with all of the Indian Army's artillery guns to accommodate various tactical requirements. The smart shell will incorporate three-mode fuse operation, fin stabilization, and canard control. A minimum range of 8 km (5.0 mi) and a maximum range of 38 km (24 mi) are anticipated. The smart shell will have three explosion modes: delayed, height of burst, and point detonation.

== Variants ==
- Towed variant (Original 45-calibre)
- Towed 52-calibre: AWEIL upgraded the gun system into 155mm 52-calibre which can now fire up to 42 kilometres (26 mi). Dhanush weighs less than 14,000 kilograms (31,000 lb). The newly upgraded gun has double baffle muzzle brake and retractable barrel and has a unified sighting system for day and night warfare against static and moving targets. The gun barrel has a length of 8,060 mm (317 in) and a weight of 2,790 kg (6,150 lb) and an elevation range of -3°/+70°. It has three modes of rate of fire: burst rate (three rounds in 30 seconds), intense rate (12 rounds in three minutes) and sustained rate (42 rounds for one hour). The upgraded Dhanush successfully completed the internal testing phase. The gun system is likely to participate in the Towed Gun System tender for induction into the Indian Army.
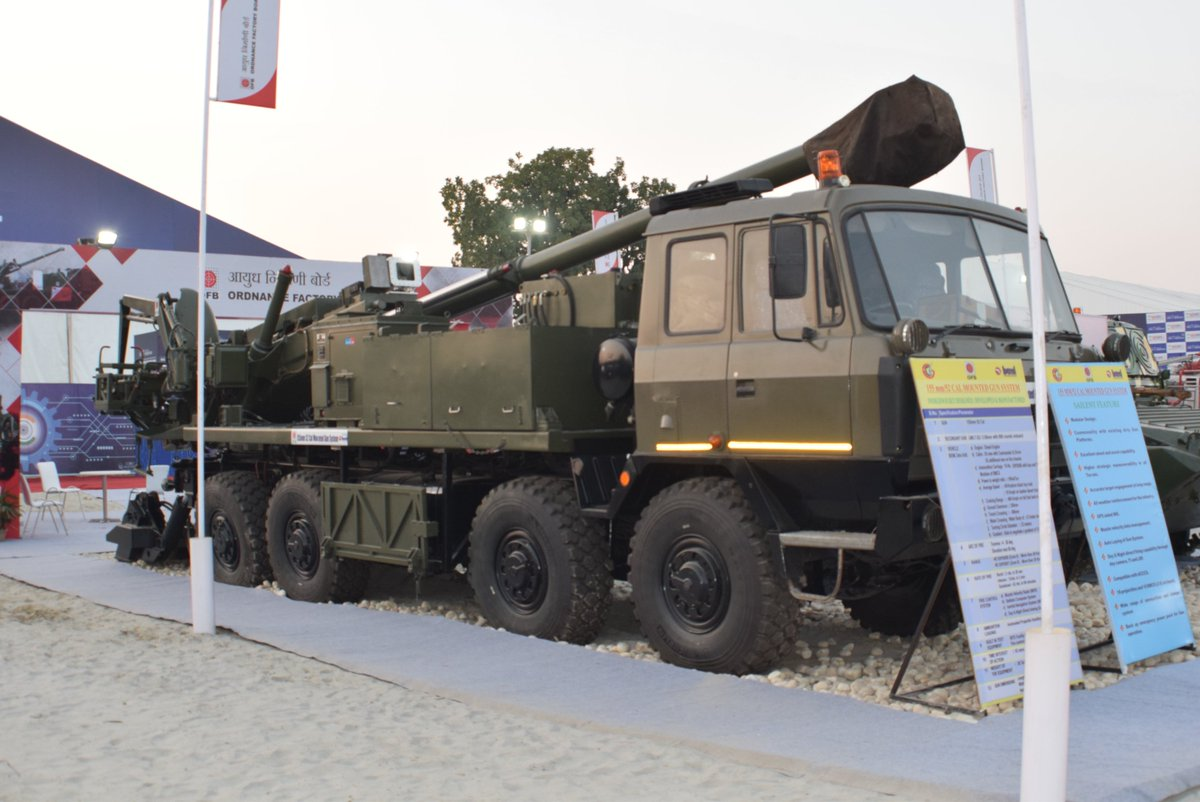
- Dhanush Mounted Gun System Prototype
  Self propelled/MGS: A vehicle mounted variant of the gun called Mounted Gun System was showcased by OFB at the Defexpo 2018 show. The gun is mounted on a 8x8 Tatra truck manufactured under license by Bharat Earth Movers Limited (BEML) and has a 30 kilometres per hour (19 mph) cross country speed and 80 kilometres per hour (50 mph) road speed.

== Operators ==
India

- Indian Army: Over 72 delivered of 114 units ordered. All units were originally scheduled to be delivered by March 2026. Four regiments raised as of March 2026. A follow-on order for 300 additional units for 15 artillery regiments has been cleared.
  - 93 Field Regiment (along Line of Actual Control)

== See also ==
- Advanced Towed Artillery Gun System
- Haubits FH77
- Bharat-52
- D-30
