= Field Artillery Rationalisation Plan =

Military plan in the Indian Army

The Field Artillery Rationalisation Plan is a procurement and development plan of the Indian Army. The programme was drafted in 1999 in the aftermath of the Kargil war, emboldened by the success of the 155 mm Bofors guns in its inventory. The programme was slated to replace the weapons of 169 artillery regiments with modern weapon systems, predominantly of 155mm calibre. The procurement involves direct import, manufacture under license, as well as inhouse development of artillery weapon systems.

Under the Field Artillery Rationalisation Plan, the army plans to procure approximately 3000–3600 weapons, at a cost of over with an outlay of over Rs 20,000 crore (approximately US$3 billion). This includes the initial purchase of 1580 towed, 814 mounted, 180 self-propelled wheeled, 100 self-propelled tracked, and 145 ultra-light 155 mm/52 calibre artillery guns. The FARP was further amplified by the Artillery Profile 2027 (acquisition plan), which was drafted in year 2008. In 2023, the Comptroller and Auditor General of India reported that only 8% of the howitzers planned for purchase by the Ministry of Defence had been received, and there is no visibility on the outcome of the remaining 77% of the proposed procurement.

== Towed guns ==
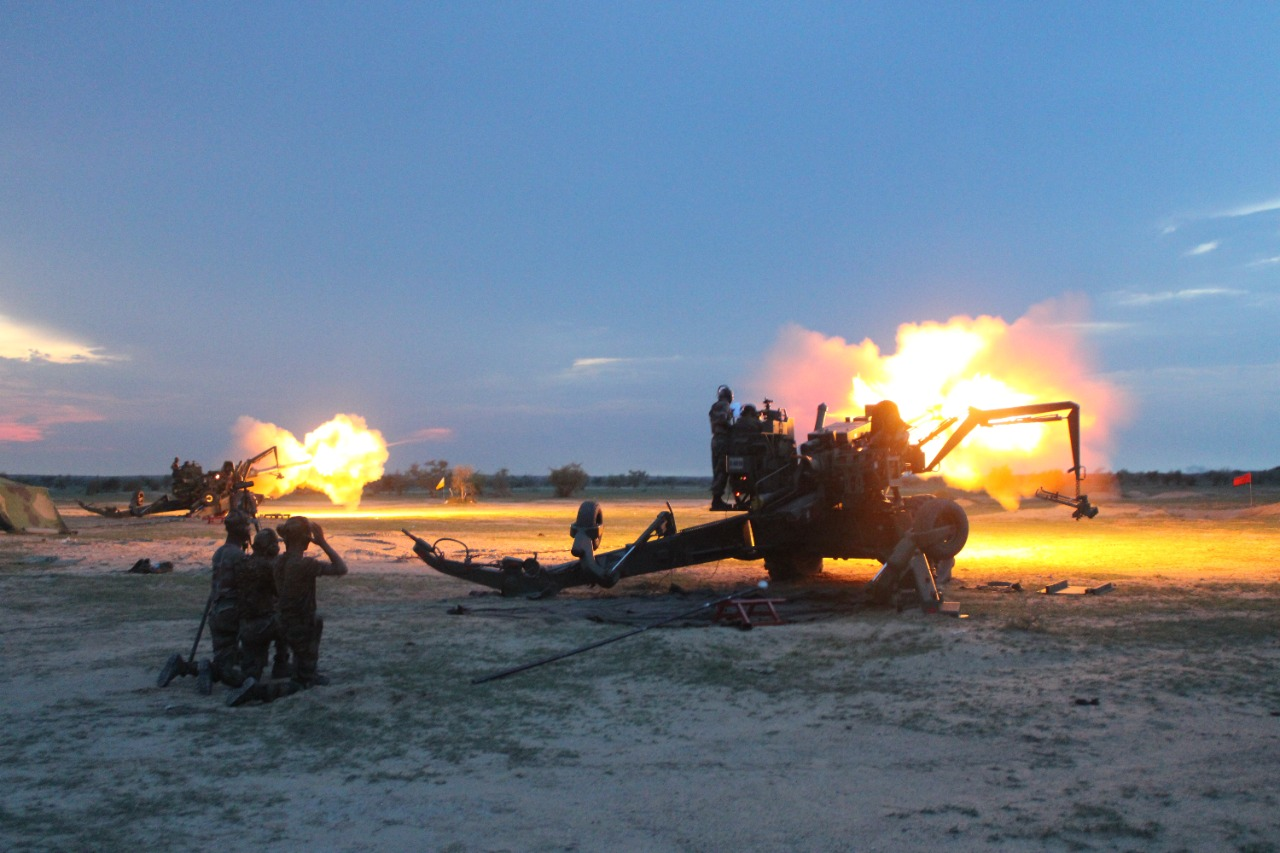
Multiple Dhanush Guns firing

=== Dhanush ===
The Indian Army has ordered 114 Dhanush howitzers of which 18 units has been delivered. The first regiment (93 Field Regiment) is operational near the Line of Actual Control (LAC). All Dhanush units are expected to be delivered by 2026.

A recent manufacturing disruption occurred due to the untimely procurement of a spare part needed for a sub-assembly. The production of the Dhanush has restarted following a pause due to a shortage of spare parts. In FY2023–2024, Advance Weapons and Equipment India Limited (AWEIL) intends to supply the Indian Army with 26 brand-new howitzers. With this, the Indian Army will have 50 Dhanush weapons overall. The Army received the first set of 6 guns in April 2019. Accidents such as barrel bursts and muzzle brake strikes marred the early years of manufacturing. At that point, the then Ordnance Factory Board (OFB) was in charge of the Gun Carriage Factory in Jabalpur. New terms and conditions were signed with the new entity AWEIL following the corporatization. According to the revised terms, the delivery is proceeding as planned.

=== ATAGS ===
The Advanced Towed Artillery Gun System (ATAGS) developed by Defence Research and Development Organisation in collaboration with production partners, Bharat Forge and Tata Advanced Systems (TSSL) is also a part of Indian Army's artillery modernisation plan.

- In May 2022, the ATAGS successfully completed a week-long validation trials in Pokhran Field Firing Range (PFFR), paving way for induction into Army.
- Also, reports suggested that an initial order, split between TASL and Bharat Forge, for 150 guns would be placed at a cost of ₹3,365 crore (equivalent to ₹39 billion or US$400 million in 2026) after releasing an RFP.
- In March 2023, the Indian Ministry of Defence received a proposal worth over $1 Billion from the Indian Army for the purchase of 307 ATAGS.
- On 20 March 2025, it was reported that the Cabinet Committee on Security (CCS) has cleared the procurement of 307 ATAGS and 327 gun towing vehicles to arm 15 artillery regiments at an estimated cost of around ₹7,000 crore (equivalent to ₹72 billion or US$750 million in 2026). It was also reported that Bharat Forge will manufacture 60% of the ATAGS order being the lowest bidder while TASL will manufacture the rest of the guns.

=== Towed Gun System (TGS) tender ===
The Army also has plans to procure 1,200 155 mm 52-calibre Towed Gun Systems (TGS) in phased manner which will become the mainstay of the Indian Army in the future. The initial order clearance (Acceptance of Necessity) for 400 units was granted on 30 November 2023 by the Defence Acquisition Council (DAC). On 16 August 2024, the Indian Army had issued a tender for the procurement of first batch of 400 units under Indian IDDM category. The tender has a worth of ₹6,500 crore (equivalent to ₹69 billion or US$720 million in 2026) and includes the purchase of towing vehicles. Indian firms like Kalyani Strategic Systems Ltd, Larsen & Toubro, Adani Defence & Aerospace and AWEIL.

The trials of contenders of TGS tenders are set to commence in 2025.

The gun system are mandated to have the following specifications:

- All up weight of less than 15 tons.
- Capable to fire all existing 155 mm rounds in the army's inventory
- Has a range of more than 40 km
- Has a minimum service life of more than 20 years.
- And a minimum barrel life of 1,500 equivalent full charges

Potential Competitors

1. KSSL Bharat 52
2. KSSL MArG ER
3. OFB Dhanush - Manufactured by AWEIL
4. DRDO ATAGS
5. L&T-Nexter Trajan 155 (evaluated by IA; 40% indigenous content in prototypes)

== Mounted guns ==
=== 105 mm L/37 mounted guns ===
In November 2023, reports confirmed the Indian Army's plans to procure 200 units of 105 mm L/37 mounted howitzers.

In March 2024, the Garuda 105 V2 of KSSL was airdropped by a C-17 Globemaster of the Indian Air Force, hinting that the platform is under trials.

On 11 April 2025, the Defence Acquisition Council granted the Acceptance of Necessity (AoN) for the procurement of a 105mm/37 Calibre Mounted Gun System (Paradroppable) along with ammunition vehicles.

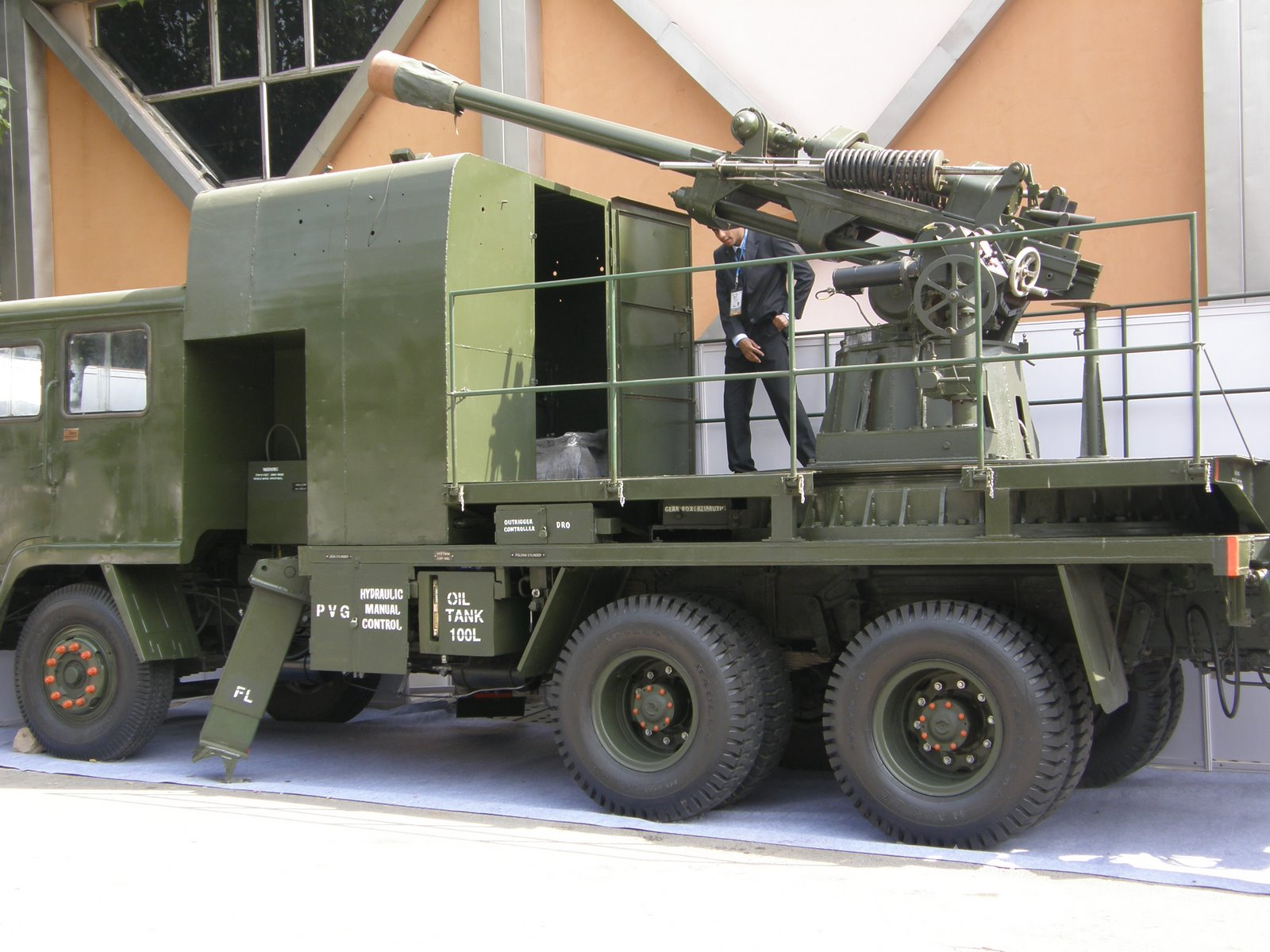
Prototype based on Indian Field Gun mounted on VFJ-GFC 6×6 Truck

Potential Competitors

1. IFG Mk2 SPH (6×6 truck)
2. KSSL Garuda 105 (4×4 truck)
3. KSSL Garuda 105 V2 (4×4 AFV)

=== 155 mm L/52 Mounted Gun Systems (MGS) ===
The Indian Ministry of Defence (MoD) has given Acceptance of Necessity (AoN) to procure 814 units of 155 mm L/52 calibre Mounted Guns. The guns should have a maximum range of more than 38 km, have a maximum weight of 30 tonnes and should be able to fire all existing 155 mm rounds in the Indian Army's inventory.

The trials of contenders of MGS tenders are set to commence in 2025.

Potential Competitors

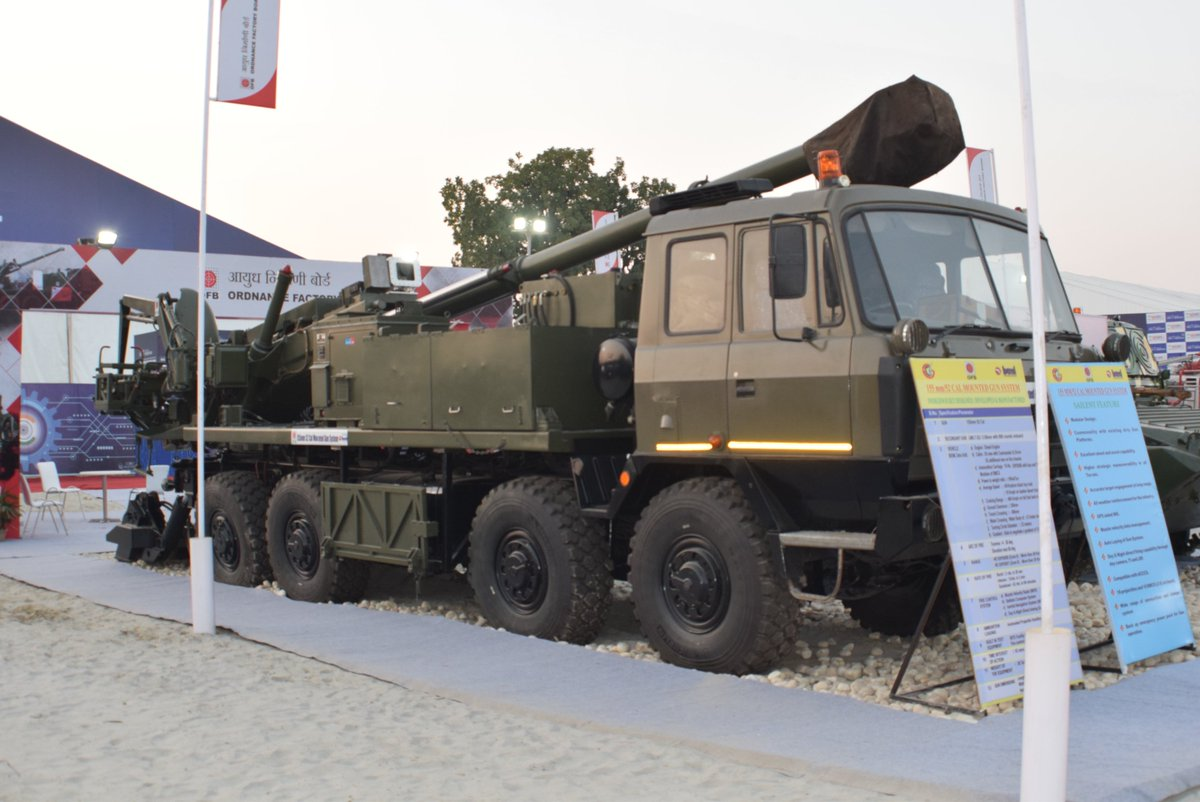
Dhanush based MGS prototype on 8×8 BEML truck

1. DRDO ATAGS (MGS variant)
2. OFB Dhanush (MGS variant)
3. TASL 155 mm Mounted Gun System (ATAGS gun on Tata LPTA 3945/3138 8×8 chassis; vehicle range of 600km and maximum speed of 85 kmph)
4. CAESAR (mounted on Ashok Leyland Super Stallion 6×6 chassis; local production by L&T)
5. ATMOS 2000
6. Archer Artillery System

== Self-propelled wheeled guns ==
As part of the Field Artillery Rationalisation Plan, the Indian Army is inducting new wheeled self-propelled guns, which are planned for acquisition between 2025 and 2027. The wheeled self-propelled guns is included in the Indian Army's procurement of 2800 to 3000 155mm.52 calibre mounted guns and howitzers.

== Self-propelled tracked guns ==
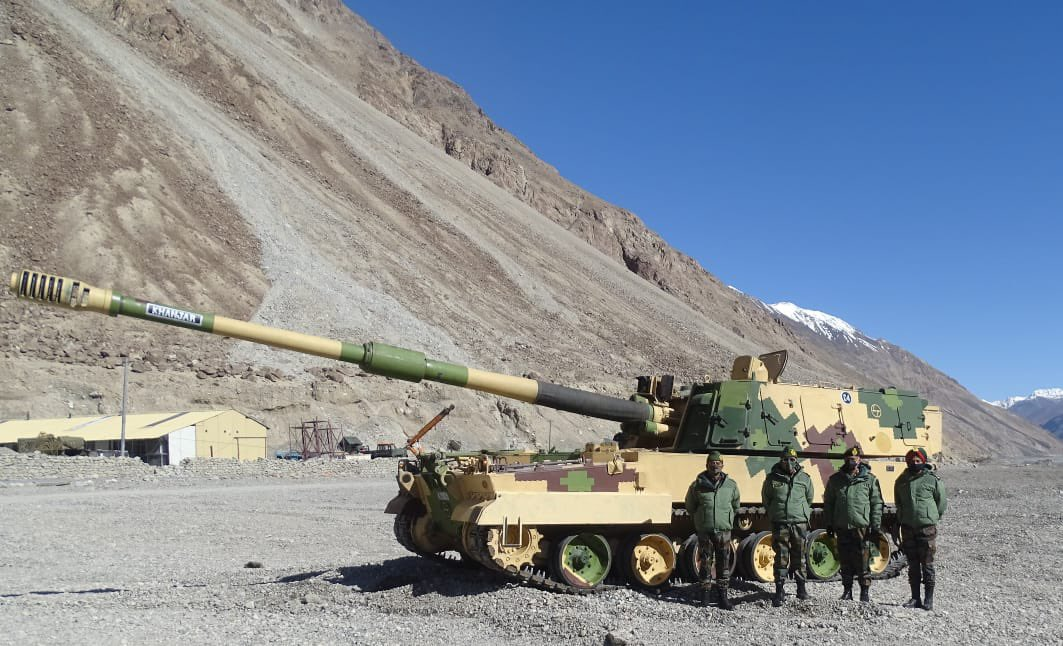
Indian K9 SPH in Ladakh

In September 2015, the Indian Ministry of Defense (MoD) selected Hanwha Techwin and Larsen & Toubro as preferred bidder to supply 100 K9 Vajra-T to the Indian Army after K9 outperformed 2S19 Msta-S and passed two-year trial. On 6 July 2016, India agreed to purchase 100 K9 Vajra-T for $750 million. On 29 March 2017, The Government of India approved budget of $646 million for purchasing 100 K9 Vajra-T. A formal contract of $310 million was signed between Hanwha Techwin and Larsen & Toubro in New Delhi on 21 April. Hanwha Techwin was to supply first 10 K9 Vajra-T, and 90 were to be license produced in India by Larsen & Toubro.

K9 Vajra-T consist 14 major Indian manufactured systems, 50% of component by value, which include Nub ammunition capable FCS and its storage, communication system, and environment control and NBC protection system. Additional systems were installed such as GPS (Gunner's Primary Sight) for direct firing capability, and South African APU, which was proven for desert operation—Korean APU was under development phase during Indian trial. The vehicle's overall design was modified to suitable for operation in desert and high temperature condition, including the change of firing rate to 3 rounds in 30 seconds.. The Indian Army completed high altitude trials at Ladakh under cold climatic conditions. After satisfactory performance at high altitude terrain, the MoD planned a repeat order of 200 K9 Vajra-T worth ₹9,600 crore. The new batch will equip enhanced engine suited for high altitude operation, and is expected to complete delivery by 2028. The proposal for first 100 units was cleared on 27 September 2022. In February 2023, Hanwha received an order for 100 vehicles. Additional order for 100 units are planned. In May 2024, a report suggested, another 100 units of the gun would be cleared after the formation of a new government after the 2024 Indian general election. The Cabinet Committee on Security cleared the purchase of 100 units on 12 December 2024. On 3 April 2025, L&T signed another contract with Hanwha Aerospace at $253 million to execute the order. The indigenous content of the system is expected to be over 60% for the order.

On 10 June 2026, India Today reported that the Indian Army is planning to acquire another tranche of over 300 Vajra howitzers at a cost of around ₹23,000 crore (US$2.4 billion). The DAC approved the acceptance of necessity for 300 additional K9 Vajra self propelled tracked howitzers in 26 October 2026.

== Ultra-light Howitzers ==
After three years of searching and negotiations, India ordered M777 155 mm L/39 ultra-light howitzer from USA in September 2013.

The Indian Army first announced plans to acquire 145 guns for ₹30 billion (US$312 million), but purchase plans were overtaken when the procurement process was restarted in July 2010. India's Ministry of Defence cleared the proposal for buying 145 guns for US$660 million on 11 May 2012 through the US Government's Foreign Military Sales (FMS) process. This was put up before the Ministry of Finance for clearance and will subsequently be taken up by the Cabinet Committee on Security for final approval. On 2 August 2013, India requested the sale of 145 M777 howitzers for US$885 million. On 24 February 2014 the purchase was again postponed. On 11 May 2014 the purchase was cleared by India's Ministry of Defence. On 11 July 2014, the Government of India announced that it would not order the guns because of cost issues. On 22 November 2014, the selection process was restarted under the "Make In India" program. On 13 May 2015, the Ministry of Defence approved ₹29 billion (₹2,900 crore) to buy 145 M777 ultralight howitzers from the US. On 15 December 2015, the Indian Ministry of Defence said it was keen on placing a follow-up order of 500 more M777 guns.

On 26 June 2016, it was announced that 145 guns will be purchased by India for US$750 million. The Indian government completed the deal on 30 November 2016. Under the agreement, BAE Systems was to supply 25 ready-built howitzers, while 120 guns were to be manufactured in India by Mahindra Defence Systems Limited. A total of 7 artillery regiments are planned, each of 18 guns. The first regiment was planned to be raised by end-2020 with 15 guns supplied by BAE systems and three guns supplied by Mahindra Defense Systems Limited.

The Indian Army received its first shipment comprising two howitzers on 18 May 2017 in New Delhi from United States in ready to use condition. It was reported that on 2 September 2017, the barrel of one of the howitzers was damaged while firing during calibration trials. The procurement of 145 guns was completed by 2023.

The Indian army used the M777 howitzer in the Himvijay exercise (2021) in Arunachal Pradesh which involved the newly raised integrated battle groups.

In July 2020, in the wake of escalating tension with China in light of hostile Chinese posturing, particularly on the border between the Union Territory of Ladakh and Tibet, further purchases of Excalibur shells were announced by the Indian Ministry of Defence. Discussions began in 2023 between India and the United States to develop an extended range of the M777 howitzer called as the M777 (ER), with India planning to upgrade all its M777 guns to this standard.

== See also ==
- List of equipment of the Indian Army
- Regiment of Artillery (India) – Artillery arm of the Indian Army
- Submarine-building Perspective Plan – Indian submarine diesel-electric acquistion project
