= PEX (disambiguation) =

PEX is cross-linked polyethylene, a form of polyethylene with cross-links.

PEX or Pex may also refer to:

== Science and technology ==
- Peer exchange, a method to gather peers for BitTorrent
- PHIGS Extension to X, in programming
- Pex, a unit testing framework for the .NET programming languages
- Pexeso Inc., a digital rights technology company
- Physical examination, in medicine
- Plasma exchange, a form of plasmapheresis
- Potassium ethyl xanthate, an organosulfur ligand used as a flotation agent in the mining industry to separate metallic ores
- Pseudoexfoliation syndrome, a condition related to glaucoma
- Parasitic extraction, a tool in IC Layout Design, used for extracting parasitic elements and seeing their effects on the circuit

== Other ==
- Palestine Exchange, a stock exchange
- People Express Airlines (1980s)
- PEX, operators of OPEX stock exchange
- Pex, a character in the Doctor Who story Paradise Towers
- The Polar Express, a children's book and related film, video game and soundtrack

== See also ==
- PXE (disambiguation)
