= PXE =

PXE may refer to:

== Science and technology ==
- Pentium Extreme Edition, a variant of the Pentium D microprocessor
- Preboot Execution Environment, booting computers via a network
- Pseudoxanthoma elasticum, a genetic disease

== Other uses ==
- Proof and Experimental Establishment, an Indian defense laboratory
- PXE (EP), an EP by Ecco2K
- Power Exchange Central Europe, an energy trading platform

== See also ==
- Pex (disambiguation)
