= OPEX =

The acronym OPEX may refer to:

- Operating expense
- Operational excellence
- Opérations Extérieures (French for "External Operations"); French troops deployed in foreign territories
- OPEX (corporation)
- OPEX (Stock Exchange)
