= 97 Field Regiment (India) =

Indian Army artillery unit

- Active: 1963 – present
- Country: India
- Allegiance: India
- Branch: Indian Army
- Type: Artillery
- Size: Regiment
- Nickname: Bunker busters
- Mottos: Sarvatra, Izzat-O-Iqbal (Everywhere with Honour and Glory)
- Colors: Red & Navy Blue
- Anniversaries: 1 August – Raising Day
- Equipment: 105 mm Indian field gun

Insignia
- Abbreviation: 97 Fd Regt

97 Field Regiment is part of the Regiment of Artillery of the Indian Army.

== Formation and history ==
The regiment was raised as 97 Composite Regiment on 1 August 1963 at Namkum, Ranchi district. The first commanding officer was Lieutenant Colonel Jagjit Singh and the unit was equipped with 3.7 inch howitzers and 120 mm Brandt mortars. The regiment was subsequently converted to a mountain regiment, a field regiment and a medium regiment. It is presently designated back as a field regiment.

It has used varied equipment including 3.7 inch howitzers, 120 mm mortars, 25-pounders, 75/24 Pack Howitzers, 105/37 mm Indian field guns, 105/37 mm light field guns and the 155/45 mm Soltam guns (which is a 155 mm upgraded version of M-46 Field Gun by Soltam Systems).

== Class composition ==
The regiment is a single class regiment with Ahir troops.

== Operations ==
The regiment has taken part in the following operations –

Indo-Pakistani War of 1965

The regiment took part in Operation Ablaze soon after its raising and thus had its baptism with fire.

Nathu La and Cho La clashes

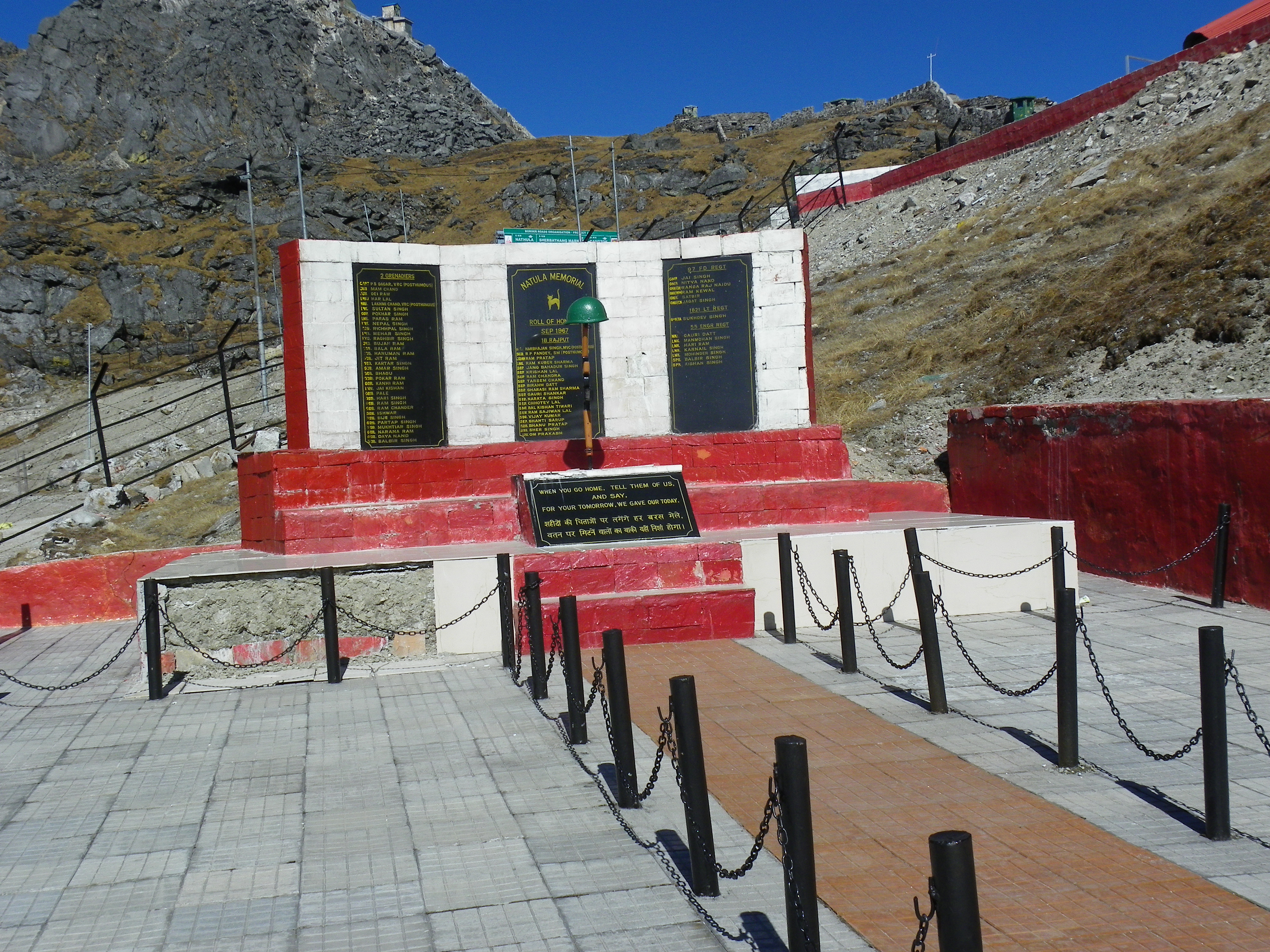
Nathu La Memorial, with list of killed in action

97 Field Regiment lost six soldiers in the Nathu La clashes in September 1967 with the Chinese People's Liberation Army (PLA). Gunner Ram Kewal, Gunner Rangaraj Naidu, Lance Naik Nitya Nand, Gunner Satbir Singh and Gunner Jai Singh were killed on 13 September 1967 and Gunner Jagat Singh on 14 September 1967.

Indo-Pakistani War of 1971

97 Mountain Regiment equipped with 75/24 Pack Howitzers saw action during Operation Cactus Lily in the Eastern Sector. It saw action in the North Western sector of the Bangladesh liberation. It was part of the 340 Mountain Brigade Group (of 20 Mountain Division under XXXIII Corps). The unit also took part in the Battle of Hilli (or Battle of Bogura). During the operations, Gunner (ORA) Dudh Nath was awarded the Sena Medal. Gunner Jag Ram was killed in action.

Internal security duties

The regiment was involved in providing support to the civil authorities during the 1979 riots in Jamshedpur. It was awarded one Shaurya Chakra and one Chief of Army Staff Commendation Card.

Counterterrorism operations

The regiment was involved in counterterrorism operations in Assam as part of Operation Rhino and during Operation Rakshak between 2014 and 2017. Captain Pramod Raghavendra Jalwadi of the unit was killed in Awantipora in October 2006.

Other operations

- Operation Parakram
- Operation Meghdoot
- Operation Snow Leopard.

== Gallantry awards ==
The regiment has won the following gallantry awards:

- Shaurya Chakra – 1 (Captain Subir Kumar Mookerjee)
- Sena Medal – 4 (Captain SK Sood, Gunner Dudh Nath, Major Saurabh Tiwari, Lieutenant Colonel Malkiat Singh).
- Mentioned in despatches – 1 (Operator Keshav Singh)
- Commendation cards – 4
- Chief of Army Staff Unit Citation in 2018 for Operation Rakshak during 2014-17
- Governor of Arunachal Pradesh Unit Citation in September 2022.
- Chief Minister of Arunachal Pradesh Appreciation in 2022 for Operation Snow Leopard.

== Achievements in sports ==
- Naib Subedar Ram Singh Yadav – Marathon (participated in London Olympics 2012, World Military Marathon 2014 And World Military Games 2011.
- Subedar Raj Kumar Yadav – Rowing (Asian Junior Rowing 2003, 10th Asian Junior Rowing 2005, Senior World Rowing 2005, Senior 11th Rowing 2005, 25th Open National Rowing 2005)

== See also ==
- List of artillery regiments of Indian Army
