= Bharat-52 =

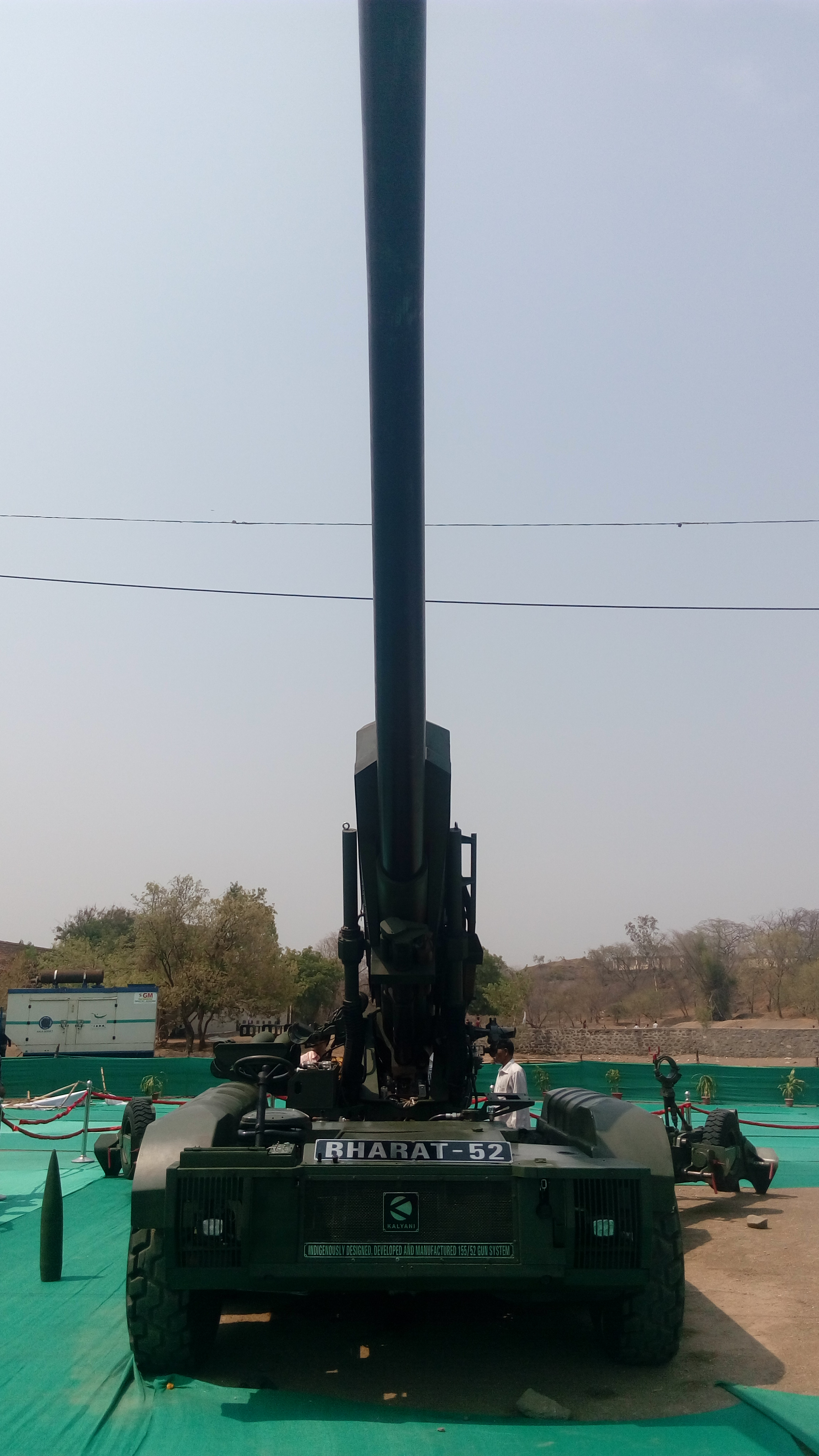
- Bharat-52 at an exhibition
- Place of origin: India

Production history
- Manufacturer: Bharat Forge

Specifications
- Mass: <15 tonnes
- Length: 10.258m
- Width: 2.880m
- Height: 2.656m
- Caliber: 155 mm (6.1 in)
- Carriage: Split Trail
- Elevation: -3° to +72° with the speed of 5°/second
- Rate of fire: Burst rate of fire : 3 rounds in 30 sec.; Intense rate of fire : 12 rounds in 3 min.; Sustained rate of fire : 42 rounds in 1 hr.
- Effective firing range: 41km

The Bharat-52 gun is a 155mm, 52 caliber towed howitzer manufactured by Bharat Forge, a subsidiary of Kalyani Group. Bharat-52 is a long-range gun system that has been completely designed and developed in India. It is designed to operate in all weather conditions and has super maneuverability on all terrains.

Bharat-52 is being considered by the Indian Army to fulfill its requirements for towed howitzers. Kalyani group has also made a strong pitch for supplying heavy weapons to the Saudi Arabian military.

Two gun systems, both developed by Kalyani Group, will be sent to Saudi Arabia for trial evaluation by the Royal Saudi Army. The guns include the Bharat 52 and the Garuda V2, a 105 mm gun mounted on a light vehicle chassis for added mobility.

The gun system is likely to participate in the Towed Gun System tender for induction into the Indian Army.

== Development ==
The Bharat-52 is a derivative of the GC-45 towed howitzer designed by Canadian artillery expert Gerald Bull's Space Research Corporation (SRC), who had earlier worked on Project HARP and later Project Babylon for Saddam Hussein.

After SRC moved to Europe, Noricum, the arms division of the Austrian steel company Voest-Alpine bought the rights to the GC-45. They made a number of detail changes to improve mass production, resulting in the GHN-45 (Gun, Howitzer, Noricum). The GHN-45 was sold to the Royal Thai Navy and China (as the PLL-01), among others.

Kalyani Group recently acquired Noricum, bringing its entire manufacturing line to India. With the purchase, Kalyani obtained intellectual property rights of the GHN-45 and developed its indigenous derivative, the Bharat-45.

The Bharat-45, a 45 caliber howitzer, was later further developed into a 52 caliber version designated as the Bharat-52.

== See also ==
- ATAGS
- Dhanush
- Haubits FH77
