= OFB 105 mm SPG =

Indian self-propelled tracked artillery

OFB 105 mm SPH
- Type: Self-propelled howitzer
- Place of origin: India

Production history
- Designer: Ordnance Factory Board

Specifications
- Mass: 16 t (16 long tons; 18 short tons)
- Crew: 5
- Shell: 105 x 372 mm R HE, HESH, HEAT, illuminating, smoke
- Caliber: 105 mm (4.1 in)
- Elevation: -5° to +73°
- Traverse: 360 degrees
- Rate of fire: 4 Normal, 6 Intense
- Maximum firing range: 19 km (12 mi)
- Sights: 104A Indirect, 106A Direct.
- Main armament: 105 mm Light Field Gun, 42 rounds
- Maximum speed: 65 km/h (40 mph)

OFB 105mm SPG is an Indian self-propelled tracked artillery. It has been developed & manufactured by Ordnance Development Centre, Ordnance Factory Medak. This is developed from Light Field Gun mounted on BMP 2 Sarath (licensed manufactured by India)

== Design ==
The weapon is based on Sarath's (License produced variant of Russian BMP-2) hull mounted with Indian towed 105 mm Light field Gun (LFG). The system can stow 42 rounds of ammunition. The artillery can be used to destroy enemy fortification and also in anti-tank role. The Original sights of 105 mm LFG have been retained. A GPS have been provided for navigation. The turret provides level-3 protection for the crew. It was first displayed in February 2010 during DEFEXPO-2010 in New Delhi and it was developed to replace the FV433 Abbot SPG in the Indian army. There is option of composite armour turret to increase protection of crew against 12.7 mm (0.50 in) weapons. An autoloader along with Fire control system can also be provided to achieve Multiple Rounds Simultaneous Impact. TALIN 500 Inertial Navigation System can also be installed to navigate in regions where GPS is unavailable due to terrain masking or enemy jamming, ammunition carrying capacity can also be increased to 92 rounds. Time required for deployment is 1 minute.
