= ATAGS (howitzer) =

Indian 155 mm (L/52) howitzer

Advanced towed artillery gun system (ATAGS)
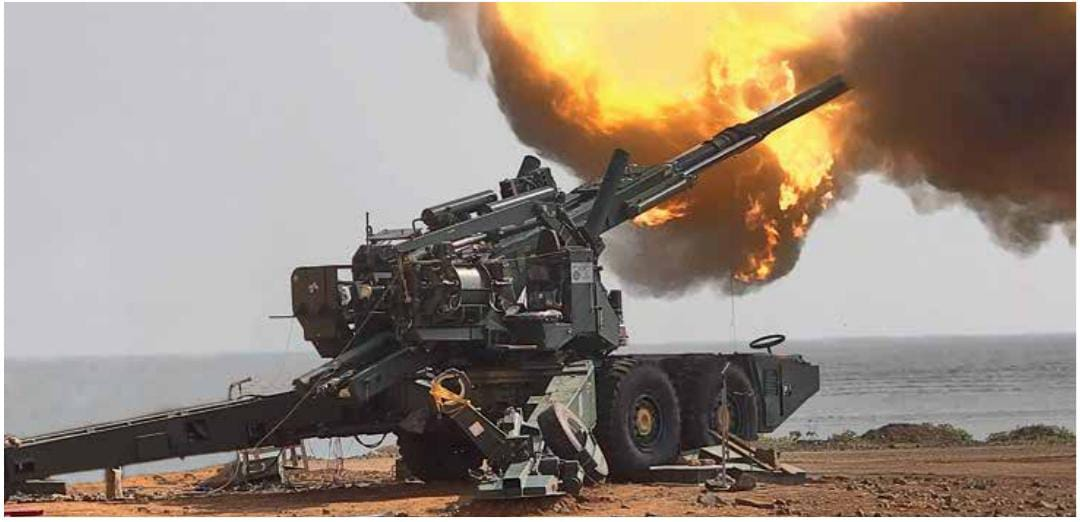
- ATAGS during firing trials
- Type: Towed Howitzer
- Place of origin: India

Service history
- Used by: Armenian Ground Forces; Indian Army

Production history
- Designer: Armament Research and Development Establishment (Project Director: RP Pandey); Tata Power SED; Bharat Forge
- Designed: 2013-2017
- Manufacturer: Kalyani Strategic Systems; Tata Advanced Systems
- Produced: 2019
- No. built: 24 (excluding prototypes)

Specifications
- Mass: Previously, 18 tonnes (18 long tons; 20 short tons). Now, 12 tonnes (12 long tons; 13 short tons).
- Barrel length: 8,060 mm (317 in) L/52
- Crew: 6-8
- Caliber: 155 mm
- Action: Auto gun alignment and positioning
- Breech: Screw type
- Recoil: Electro-rheological/Magneto-rheological
- Elevation: Servo based, -3/+75°
- Traverse: Servo based, ±25°, 25 m diameter
- Rate of fire: Burst: 5 rounds in 60 sec. Improved to 6 rounds in 30 sec.; Intense: 10 rounds in 2 min 30 sec; Sustained: 60 rounds in 60 min
- Effective firing range: >45 km
- Maximum firing range: 48.074 km (High Explosive Base Bleed Shell); 80 km (Ramjet Shell)
- Feed system: Automatic ammunition handling including crane
- Sights: Thermal sight Gunners display
- Maximum speed: With towing vehicle 60-80 km/h, Self propelled 18 km/h with 95 kW APU

The Advanced Towed Artillery Gun System (ATAGS) is a towed 155 mm, 52-calibre howitzer that is being developed for the Indian Army by Armament Research and Development Establishment (ARDE), Tata Advanced Systems (TASL) and Kalyani Strategic Systems (KSSL), a subsidiary of Bharat Forge. The latter two are the development and manufacturing partners for the programme. ATAGS is named Amogh in Indian Army service, or Tork/Tir in Armenian Ground Forces service.

== Development ==
Advanced towed artillery gun system (ATAGS)

The ATAGS project was started in 2013 by the Defence Research and Development Organisation (DRDO) to replace older guns in service in the Indian Army with a modern 155mm artillery gun. DRDO laboratory Armament Research and Development Establishment (ARDE) partnered with private players Bharat Forge, Mahindra Defence Naval System, Tata Power SED and public sector unit Advanced Weapons and Equipment India for this purpose.

With ARDE as the nodal laboratory, development is being assisted by Instruments Research and Development Establishment (IRDE), Vehicle Research and Development Establishment (VRDE), Proof and Experimental Establishment (PXE), Centre for Artificial Intelligence and Robotics (CAIR), and Defence Electronics Applications Laboratory (DEAL). It was part of the Development cum Production Partner programme (DCPP) of DRDO.

The development of the gun took about 4 years and is expected to be complete by March 2017. The delay in completion of the project was attributed to realization of ordnance and recoil system and supply issue with manufacturing of sub-systems. The gun is expected to start user trials in 2017 and production is expected to start in 2019.

It was first publicly showcased at 68th Republic Day parade on 26 January 2017. Both the prototypes of TASL and KSSL was part of the parade. For the first time, an indigenously developed howitzer gun, the ATAGS was included in the 21-gun salute alongside the British origin 25-pounder as part of the 76th Independence day celebrations. Two howitzer were included in the battery that fired the 21 gun salute. ATAGS is being fast-tracked by Indian Army for induction as of 27 September 2022.

=== Trials ===
The ATAGS has undergone several trials since 2016.

- 14 July 2016: DRDO conducted the proof firing of armament for the 155/52 calibre advanced towed artillery gun system. The test was successful. The prototypes P1 and P2 of KSSL and TASL was tested in Proof and Experimental Establishment (PXE), Balasore. The two prototypes were followed by P3 and P4 after clearance.
- 14 December 2016: A fully integrated,155-millimeter artillery gun fired its first rounds of live ammunition at the Proof and Experimental Establishment (PXE) in Balasore, Odisha.
- 24 August – 7 September 2017: ATAGS underwent summer/desert trials in Pokhran Field Firing Range (PFFR). During the trials, it broke the then world record for 155 mm/52 calibre gun by firing the round to a distance of 47.2 kilometres. It again registered a maximum distance of 48.074 kilometres with high explosive–base bleed (HE–BB) ammunition, surpassing the maximum ranges fired by any artillery gun system in this category.
- March 2018: ATAGS successfully completed winter trials in Sikkim at an altitude of 11,000 feet (3,400 m) and a temperature of −20 °C. The mobility of the gun was favourable at the high altitudes. The manufacturing of first lot of 40 guns was to start soon. At heights of more than 13,000 feet (4,000 m), ATAGS participated in extended firing exercises with only the backup battery.
- 20 May – 5 June 2019: ATAGS underwent User Assisted Technical Trials (UATT) at Pokhran's PFFR with assistance from scientists of ARDE and army officers of Corps of Artillery. The gun achieved all objectives of the trials and hit targets at a range of 45 kilometres. This was the last of developmental trials and the gun was being prepared for user trials and was expected to be delivered by early September in 2019.
- September 2020: The user trials of the gun were underway in Pokhran Field Firing Range (PFFR) when one of the guns suffered a major setback with a barrel burst injuring four personnel. Investigations are on to ascertain and solve the problem. During the 2020 trial, the KSSL variant ATAGS fired 130+ rounds successfully and TASL-variant ATAGS fired 99 rounds successfully. It was during the firing of the 100th round (5th round of burst firing) of the TASL gun in which the accident occurred. In November 2020, after an investigation the gun was cleared for further trials.
- February 2021: ATAGS successfully completed another rounds of winter trials at high altitude conditions in Sikkim. Mobility of the gun was a major aspect in the trials. During the trials, the KSSL ATAGS was moved to the northernmost operational point of North Sikkim at Lukrep up to an altitude of 15,500 feet (4,700 m). The gun covered a distance of 341 km (212 mi) in around 10 days negotiating terrains with steep gradient and hairpin bends with ease without needing to unhook the gun from the tower. Mobility of the gun was tested for a distance of 526 km (327 mi). Bharat Forge and Tata guns had the same performance factors. Further desert trials were expected in June.
- 26 April – 2 May 2022: The ATAGS successfully completed a week-long validation trials in Pokhran Field Firing Range (PFFR), paving way for induction into Army.
- Mid-2024: Armenia conducted several successful tests of the 6 units of ATAGS that have been delivered at various locations.

=== Production ===
==== Armenia ====
Armenian Ground Forces ordered 6 ATAGS from Kalyani Strategic Systems (KSSL) by August 2023. The guns were manufactured in KSSL's facility in Pune. They were delivered to Armenia by the end of 2023. As of October 2024, they intend to purchase additional 84 units after successful trials at different locations.

==== India ====
Post completion of trials of ATAGS in 2022, reports suggested that an initial order, split between TASL and Bharat Forge, for 150 guns would be placed at a cost of ₹3,365 crore (equivalent to ₹39 billion or US$420 million in 2026) after releasing an RFP.

In March 2023, the Indian Ministry of Defence received a proposal worth over $1 Billion from the Indian Army for the purchase of 307 ATAGS. The order will be split at a ratio of 60:40 ratio. Kalyani Strategic Systems (KSSL) has emerged to be the lowest bidder followed by Tata Advanced Systems (TASL). However, TASL needs to meet the price bid of KSSL to receive the 40% order share. It was reported on 19 November 2024, Bharat Forge, the parent company of KSSL, is participating in price negotiations with the Ministry of Defence for the ATAGS contract. The deal, worth ₹8,500 crore (equivalent to ₹88 billion or US$940 million in 2026), was to be signed by 31 March 2025.

On 20 March 2025, it was reported that the Cabinet Committee on Security (CCS) has cleared the procurement of 307 ATAGS and 327 6×6 gun towing vehicles to arm 15 artillery regiments at an estimated cost of around ₹6,900 crore (equivalent to ₹71 billion or US$760 million in 2026). The contract is expected to be signed next week. Following this, further orders could be placed later under the Field Artillery Rationalisation Plan. It was also reported that KSSL will manufacture 60% of the ATAGS order due to being the lowest bidder and TASL will manufacture the remaining 40%. The contract was signed on 26 March. The guns will replace outdated 105 mm and 130 mm guns of the Army. Over 65% of the gun's components are indigenous which includes major subsystems such as the barrel, muzzle brake, breech mechanism, firing and recoil system, and ammunition handling mechanism.

By July 2025, the first gun system was ready for its product model test while the first regiment of ATAGS is to be raised by February 2027. The project has been termed as "an exemplary Mission Mode success" by the ARDE Director. In November 2026, Bharat Forge announced that they have received the Bulk Production Clearance for the ATAGS project. Further, the deliveries are expected to commence from fiscal year of 2027–28 with the entire 184 units to be delivered within four years. The production will be ramped up in phases as per Army's absorption rate and induction schedule with 10% to be delivered in the first year.

== Design ==
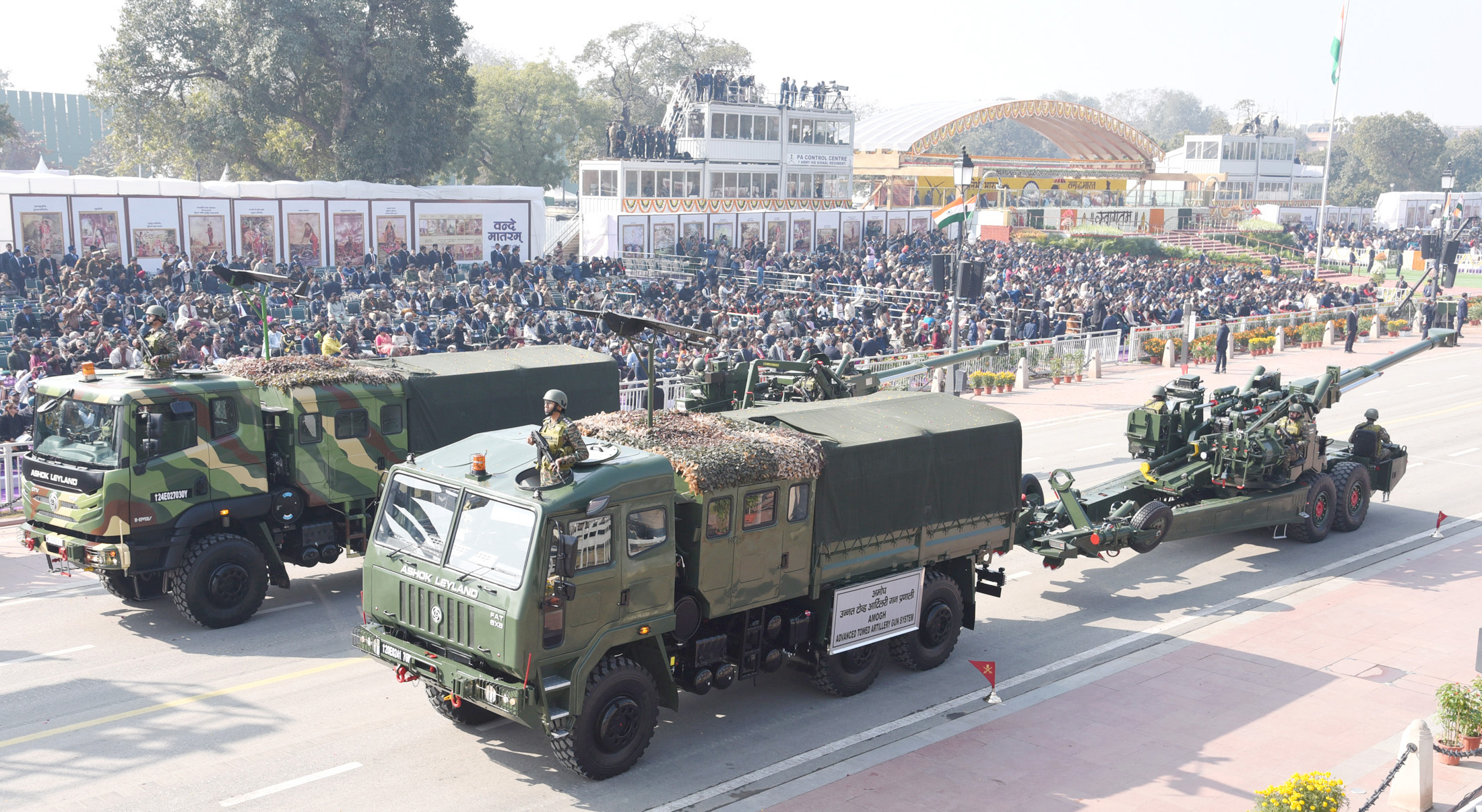
ATAGS at Republic for the ATAGS project and they the delivery is expected from day Parade 2026.

The gun consists of a barrel, breech mechanism, muzzle brake and recoil mechanism to fire 155 mm calibre ammunition with a firing range of 48 km. It has an all-electric drive to ensure reliability and minimum maintenance over a long period of time. It has advanced features like high mobility, quick deployment, auxiliary power mode, advanced communication system, automatic command and control system with night capability in direct-fire mode. The gun has a six round magazine instead of a standard three round magazine. The gun is two tons lighter than guns in the same category and is designed to provide better accuracy and range. It can fire six rounds in 30 seconds and is capable of firing five successive rounds in short duration.

It is compatible with C3I systems like Artillery Combat Command and Control System (ACCCS) called Shakti for technical fire control, fire planning, deployment management, operational logistics management of the Indian Army. ATAGS has auto loading and positioning system, auto laying system, muzzle velocity radar, safety interlocks and redundancy systems. The gun can fire up to Zone 7 bi-modular charge system.

The gun is towed by Ashok Leyland FAT 6×6 truck and can change over from towing mode to firing mode within 2 minutes. The ATAGS artillery gun features shoot-and-scoot capability and can be deployed to fire a shell within just 90 seconds. It takes 2.5 minutes during the day and 3 minutes at night for the complete system to be prepared for action.

=== Ammunition ===
==== Ramjet-Propelled Artillery Shell ====
As of February 2020, IIT Madras, in partnership with IIT Kanpur, Armament Research and Development Establishment and Research Centre Imarat, is working on redesigning an existing 155 mm shell using ramjet propulsion that can cover 60 km+ range. It will be made compatible with Haubits FH77, Dhanush, K9 Vajra-T and ATAGS. The shell will incorporate a Precision Guidance Kit for trajectory correction. IIT Madras will ensure that Munitions India can manufacture the shells. A number of technological advances have already been verified. The development team is awaiting product validation and prototyping now that the design is complete. Prototype is expected to be developed within three to four years.

The project was started in 2020 by partnering with the Army Technology Board. Early trials of a scaled down system was conducted from an IIT Madras developed 76 mm gun confirmed the fundamental idea. Internal and external ballistics were validated by subsequent testing carried out in September 2025 at the School of Artillery, which successfully demonstrated clean gun exit, stable flight, and ramjet activation.

With this approach, the range of conventional shells will be enhanced by 30–50% without losing their lethality. It was approved by the Army Technology Board. It can be retrofitted onto all the existing 155 mm artillery shells. As of December 2025, developmental tests at Pokhran Field Firing Range and IIT Madras had been successful, showing that the shell can depart the gun efficiently at wider operational zones.

By 12 January 2026, IIT Madras successfully conducted several in-house tests of the ramjet unit. The ramjet engine was incorporated into an in-service 155 mm artillery shell, replacing the traditional base bleed unit. The project is led by IIT Madras Aerospace Engineering department faculty P.A. Ramakrishna and retired Indian Army officer Lt General P R Shankar among others. Range improvements were demonstrated in trials carried out on different artillery platforms. The range in K9 Vajra-T increased from 36 km to approximately 62 km, in Dhanush, the range is from approximately 30 km to approximately 55 km, and in ATAGS, it is from approximately 40 km to nearly 70 km. A similar technology is expected to be developed for rocket artillery.

==== Smart Artillery Shell ====
The development of 155 mm Smart Ammunition for the Regiment of Artillery by Munitions India and IIT Madras was reported in February 2024. The period of development is roughly two years. The goal is to improve the accuracy and lethality of artillery shells during terminal impact. The smart shell can be launched from 155 mm 39- and 45-calibre guns, including Dhanush, ATAGS, and K9 Vajra-T. It will achieve a circular error probable (CEP) of 10 m (33 ft) against 500 m (1,600 ft) CEP for conventional shells. It requires housing of miniaturize electronics and sensors package with a guidance, navigation, and control system. To improve accuracy, the smart artillery round will use NavIC, with a GPS backup. It will be interoperable with all of the Indian Army's artillery guns to accommodate various tactical requirements. The smart shell will incorporate three-mode fuse operation, fin stabilization, and canard control. A minimum range of 8 km (5.0 mi) and a maximum range of 38 km (24 mi) are anticipated. The smart shell will have three explosion modes: delayed, height of burst, and point detonation.

== Mounted Gun System (MGS) ==
Mounted Gun System (MGS)
- Type: Truck-mounted self-propelled howitzer
- Place of origin: India

Service history
- Used by: Indian Army (planned)

Production history
- Designer: Vehicle Research and Development Establishment (Project Director: Bharat Kushwaha)
- Manufacturer: Kalyani Strategic Systems; Bharat Earth Movers Limited
- Produced: 2022
- No. built: 1 technology demonstrator

Specifications
- Mass: 30 tonnes (30 long tons; 33 short tons)
- Caliber: 155 mm/52 calibre
- Elevation: 0°/+72°
- Rate of fire: Burst: 3+ rounds in 30 sec; Intense: 12 rounds in 3 min; Sustained: 42 rounds in 60 min
- Effective firing range: 45 km
- Maximum firing range: High Explosive Extended Range Full Bore (ERFB BT) – 35 km, High Explosive Extended Range Full Bore Base Bleed (ERFB BB) – 45 km; Ramjet Propelled Shell – 78 km (under development)

The Vehicle Research and Development Establishment developed the first mounted gun system technology demonstrator of India with shoot-and-scoot capability. It is a truck-mounted self propelled artillery variant with ATAGS mounted on an 8×8 High Mobility Vehicle (HMV) developed by Bharat Earth Movers Limited (BEML). The overall system weighs 30 tonnes. The technology demonstrator was revealed in DefExpo 2022.

As part of this project, DRDO has developed technology related to ammunition handling cranes, stabilizers, armoured cabins, carrier vehicles, on-board power sources, and integrated small electronic controllers. MGS can operate in both desert and mountainous environments and has high mobility in terms of gradient, side slope, trench crossing, and cross-country capacity.

The official technical features of the gun includes: –

- Has an all-up weight of 30 tonnes.
- Has a maximum range of 35 to 45 km depending on the ammunition.
- Features an elevation range of 0° to +72°.
- Each unit of MGS can carry 24 rounds of ammunition along with enough Bi-Modular Charge System (BMCS).
- The system can be transitioned from drive mode to fire mode in 80 seconds and back to drive mode from fire mode in 85 seconds.
- It can operate in the temperature range of −4 °C to +45 °C.
- It has a chamber volume of 25 litres which can be later upgraded in need.
- Features an all-electric drive and also includes a manual override system.
- Includes auto gun alignment and positioning system, fire-control system (FCS), and ammunition handling system.

The MGS system has undergone mobility and performance trials along with standalone firing trials of the armoured cabin in Balasore and Pokhran. Trials for the variant is expected to be concluded by 2026. On 7 June 2025, VRDE officially transferred the technology of the Mounted Gun System to Bharat Forge.

The Army has a projected requirement of 300 in the first phase, with the numbers expected to rise to 700–800 in future. As of July 2025, DRDO is reportedly indigenising the remaining components of the MGS. Additionally, the Indian Army has also written to VRDE — the nodal development agency — to make the technology demonstrator available for extensive user trials in variable terrain and weather conditions.

== Users ==
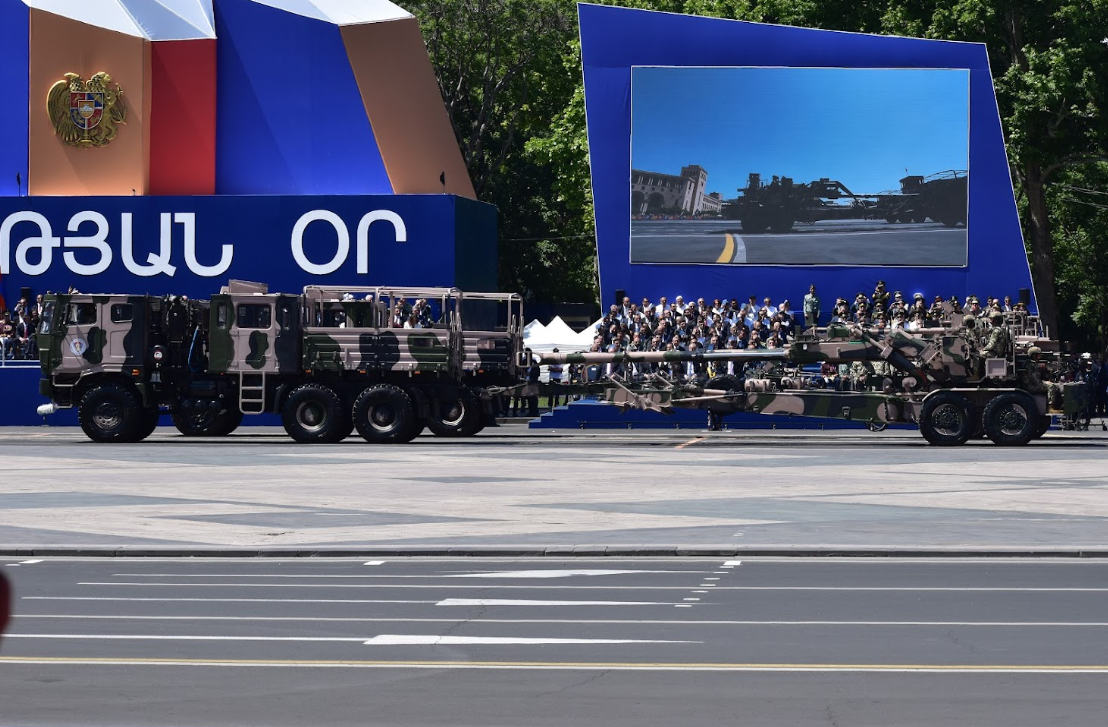
ATAGS in Armenia

ATAGS operators as of 2023

=== Current users ===
- Armenia: 6 ordered and delivered in 2023 by Bharat Forge. Another 84 units planned (deal worth US$155 million).
- Unknown European country - 18 units delivered in 2024 by Bharat Forge.

=== Future users ===
- India: 307 on order.

=== Potential users ===
- Philippines: Offered by India.

== See also ==
- List of equipment of the Indian Army
- Other towed artillery systems in use in different armies:
  - M777 howitzer – British/American 155 mm towed artillery
  - Haubits FH77 – Swedish 155 mm towed howitzer
  - FH70 – British/German/Italian 155 mm towed howitzer
  - 152 mm howitzer 2A65 Msta-B – Soviet towed artillery
  - Soltam M-71 – Israeli 155 mm towed howitzer
  - KH179 – South Korean 155 mm towed howitzer
  - SLWH Pegasus – Singaporean 155 mm towed howitzer
  - AH4 howitzer – Chinese 155 mm towed artillery
  - Panter howitzer – Turkish howitzer
