= 93 Field Regiment (India) =

Indian Army artillery unit

- Active: 1963 – present
- Country: India
- Allegiance: India
- Branch: Indian Army
- Type: Artillery
- Motto(s): Velluvom Velluvom Vetrikonde Selluvom
- Colors: "Red & Navy Blue"
- Mascot(s): Tiger
- Anniversaries: 20 June 1963

93 Field Regiment is part of the Regiment of Artillery of the Indian Army.

== History ==
Raised in Haldwani in 1963 by Lieutenant Colonel Laiq Ram, the regiment was re-organised as a field regiment at Allahabad in 1975.

== Composition ==
It presently consists of troops from South India. The war cry of the regiment is Velluvom Velluvom Vetrikonde Selluvom, which translates to We will win and we will continue to win. The regimental song is Surangani.

== Equipment ==
The regiment was originally equipped with the 105 mm Light Field Gun Mk-II variant. In 2019, the unit inducted the 155 mm 45-calibre Dhanush howitzer, becoming the first unit to be armed with this gun.

== Operations ==
Indo-Pakistani War of 1965

The regiment was part of Operation Ablaze, Operation Riddle and Operation Grand Slam in the Sialkot sector. The regiment less one battery was part of the 69 Mountain Brigade located at Mahrajke, east of Sialkot and was equipped with 3.7 howitzer guns of World War I vintage and 120 mm mortars.

Indo-Pakistani War of 1971

The regiment was located at Agartala before the war and was equipped with 75/24 mm guns . It was asked to move to Sylhet sector, where it provided artillery support. It subsequently took part in the surrender of Pakistani forces after the declaration of ceasefire on 16 December 1971.

Operation Pawan

The regiment moved from Secunderabad to Sri Lanka in October 1987 to join the Indian Peace Keeping Force. It was part of the 54 Infantry Division. The regiment lost one officer and the regimental medical officer, the latter to sniper fire during the operations in the outskirts of Jaffna.

Kargil War

The regiment was one of the first to reach Tiger Hill during Operation Vijay and provided artillery support to help the re-conquest of this important location.

Counter terrorist operations

During its counter insurgency and internal security tenures, the regiment took part in Operation Rakshak, Operation Vyavastha, Operation Rakshak II (1994-1997), Operation Rhino and Operation Fort William.

Other operations

The regiment has also participated in Operation Trident and Operation Falcon.

== Achievements ==
The regiment won the Chief of the Army Staff Unit Citation and General Officer Commanding-in-Chief (Northern Command)’s ‘unit appreciation’ award in 1998 for counter terrorist operations in Jammu and Kashmir. The unit was awarded the Chief of the Army Staff Unit Citation again in 2024. The regiment has won 6 Sena Medals, 2 Mentioned in dispatches, 10 Chief of the Army Staff's Commendation Cards and 9 General Officer Commanding in Chief's Commendation Cards.

The regiment had the honour to participate in the 71st Republic Day Parade and Army Day parade in 2020 with its new Equipment 155mm Dhanush Howitzer.

== See also ==
- List of artillery regiments of Indian Army
