= Armament Research and Development Establishment =

Defence research laboratory of DRDO in Pune, India

Armament Research & Development Establishment
- Established: 1958
- Director: A RAJU , OS
- Location: Armament PO, Pashan, Pune-411 021, Pune, Maharashtra; 18°32′09″N 73°48′00″E
- Operating agency: Defence Research & Development Organisation
- Website: ARDE Home Page

In India, the Armament Research & Development Establishment (ARDE) is a laboratory of the Defence Research and Development Organisation (DRDO). Located in Pune, it is the main DRDO lab involved in the development of conventional armaments.

== History ==
The Armament Research & Development Establishment (ARDE) was established in 1958, with the goal of achieving self-sufficiency in the field of armaments. ARDE started working from a rudimentary facility within the campus of Ammunition Factory, Khadki of the Ordnance Factory Board. Personnel were drawn from the erstwhile Technical Development Establishment (Weapons) located in Jabalpur and Technical Development Establishment (Ammunition) at Khadki of the Indian Ordnance Factories.

In 1966, ARDE moved to its present location at Pashan, on the outskirts of Pune, next to the National Chemical Laboratory, a major CSIR Laboratory.

ARDE opened the Center for Electromagnetic Launch Technology on 5 May 2025. The facility is devoted to electromagnetic railgun technology development.

== Areas of work ==
ARDE's main area of research is in the design and development of conventional armaments for the Indian Armed Forces. This stretches over the whole gamut of research, development, prototyping, test and evaluation, and transfer of technology activities. This includes basic and applied research, modeling, simulation and software development of armaments. Additionally, life extension and upgradation of in-service equipment is also carried out.

Being a research laboratory, ARDE does not carry out large-scale production activities, except for limited scale pilot-plant production of crucial items. After an initial production, the technologies developed by it are transferred to manufacturing agencies like BEL, OFB and other manufacturers. In this capacity, ARDE supervises the transfer of technology to these plants, and aids in initial productionization and quality assurance of these products.

With the Indian Armed Forces using many weapons from foreign vendors, it is necessary to integrate them and make them compatible with other existing systems in service. ARDE is involved in advising the Services regarding induction and indigenisation of weapon systems of foreign origin.

== Projects and products ==
Brief List of some of the projects and products which are and were undertaken by ARDE are as follows.

=== Small arms ===
==== 7.62×51 1A1 self loading rifle ====
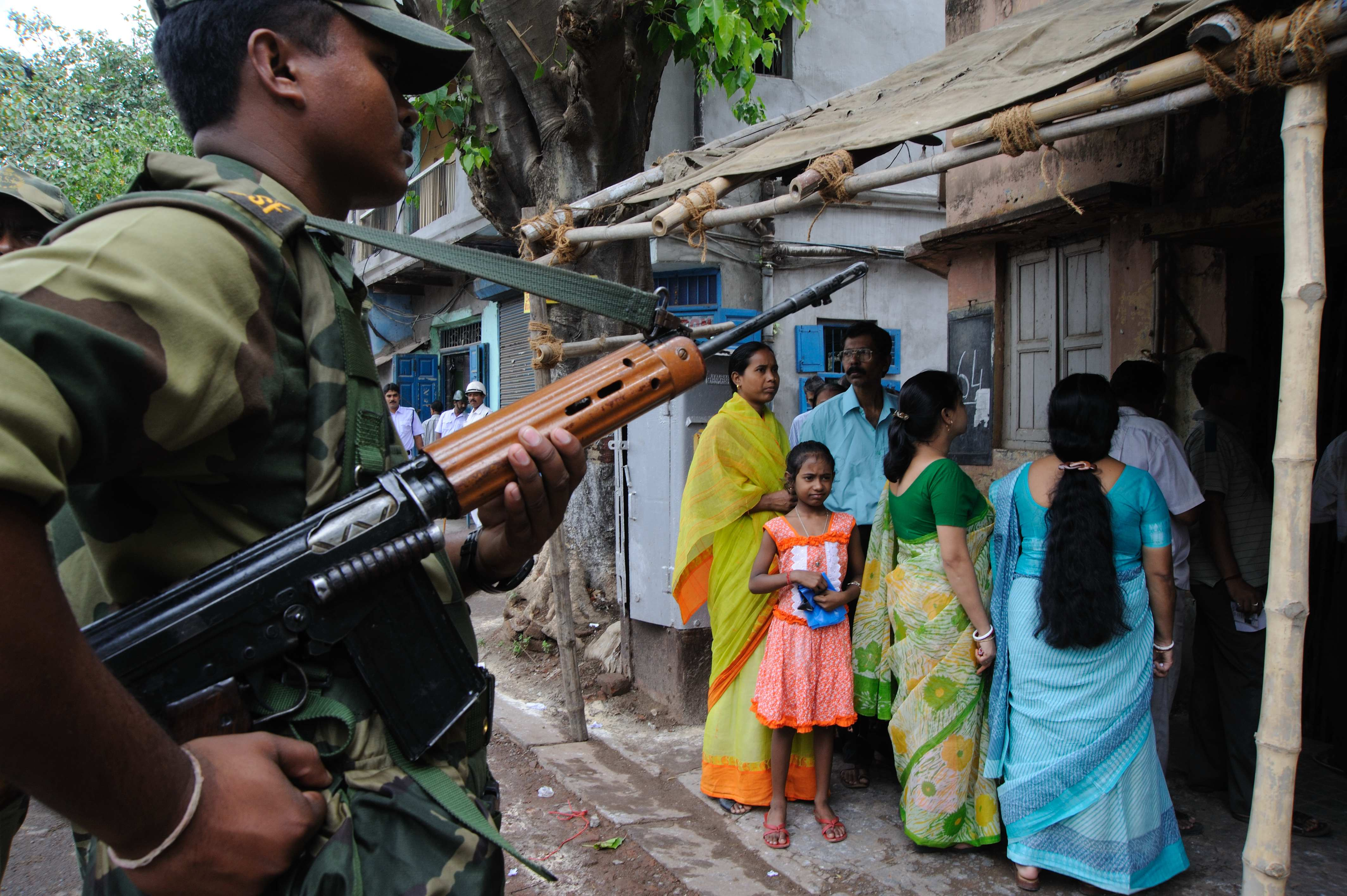
A BSF personnel carrying a 7.62mm 1A1 rifle in West Bengal during General Elections 2009.

One of the earlier ARDE developments was the 7.62 mm 1A1 self-loading rifle (SLR) and its ammunition which replaced the Ishapore 2A1 bolt-action rifles (based on the 0.303 Lee–Enfield rifle) in the Indian Army service then. Over a million rifles have been produced by the Rifle Factory Ishapore, and were used in the 1965 and 1971 Indo-Pakistan Wars.

==== INSAS 5.56 mm small arms family ====
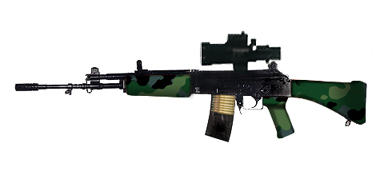
INSAS Assault rifle

Drawing heavily from its past experience with the 7.62mm SLR, ARDE developed the 5.56 mm Indian Small Arms System (INSAS). This helped standardize ammunition for infantry, reducing logistical problems. The infantry was earlier equipped with three types of small arms firing two types of ammunition, viz. 7.62 mm Ishapore SLR, LMG and 9 mm carbine. The INSAS family replaces all the three weapons, and consists of an Assault Rifle, a Light Machine Gun, and a Carbine Variant. The INSAS was introduced in 1998, and has since supplanted the SLR as the service rifle of the Indian Army.

==== ARDE Under Barrel Grenade Launcher ====
The single shot ARDE Under Barrel Grenade Launcher was developed in collaboration with Ordnance Factory Tiruchirappalli for use with the INSAS and AK-47 rifles. Stand alone versions of the grenade launcher also exist. The UBGL has an in-built safety to prevent accidental firing and a 3-point attachment for rigidity. The trigger system is, located on the side of the barrel, allowing the soldier to fire both the rifle and grenade launcher without having to change his firing posture. The weapon uses a simple ladder sight mechanism and has tritium illuminated sights for night firing. The ammunition fired by the UBGL, is similar to the Milkor MGL used by the Indian Army, allowing for standardisation.

==== ASMI sub machine gun ====
India's first indigenous sub machine gun ASMI was jointly developed by the Indian Army and ARDE.

=== Artillery and tank guns ===
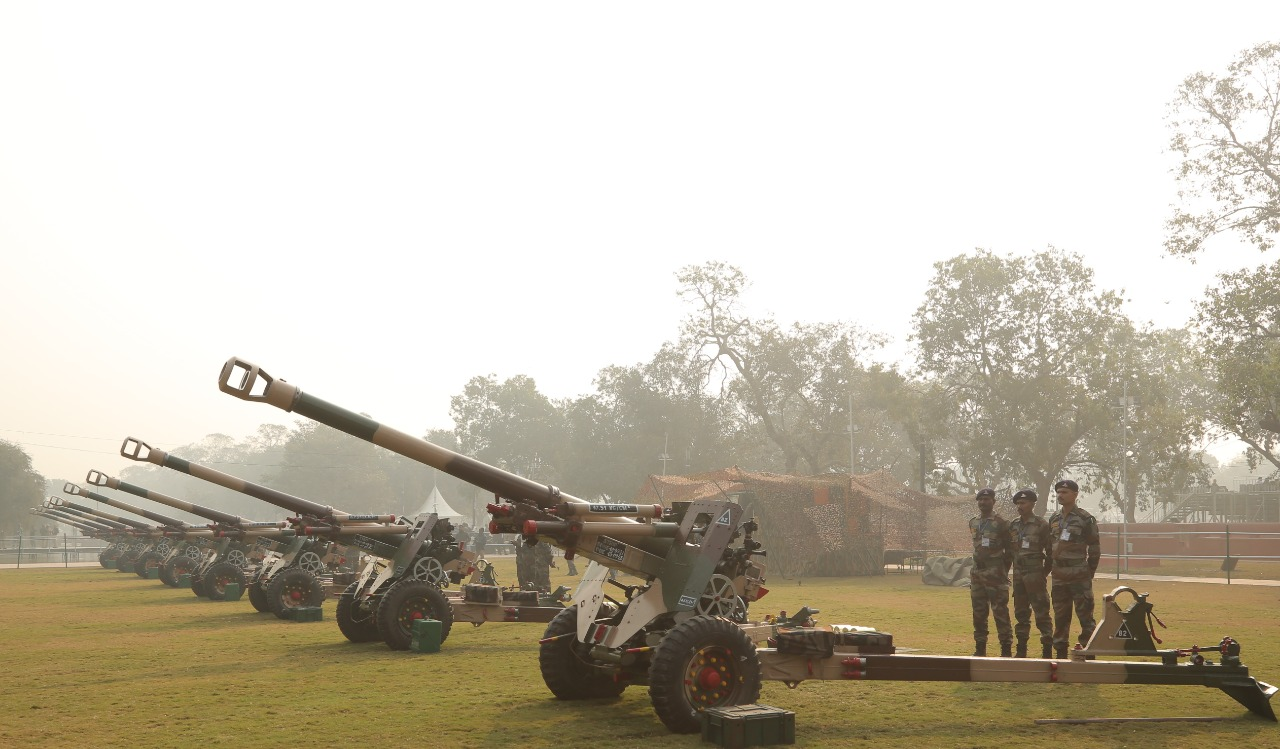
105 mm IFG during Republic day Gun Salute

==== 105 mm Indian Field Gun ====
Designed by ARDE in 1972, the Indian Field Gun (IFG). It became the mainstay of the army's field artillery after being introduced.

==== Pinaka multi barrel rocket launcher ====
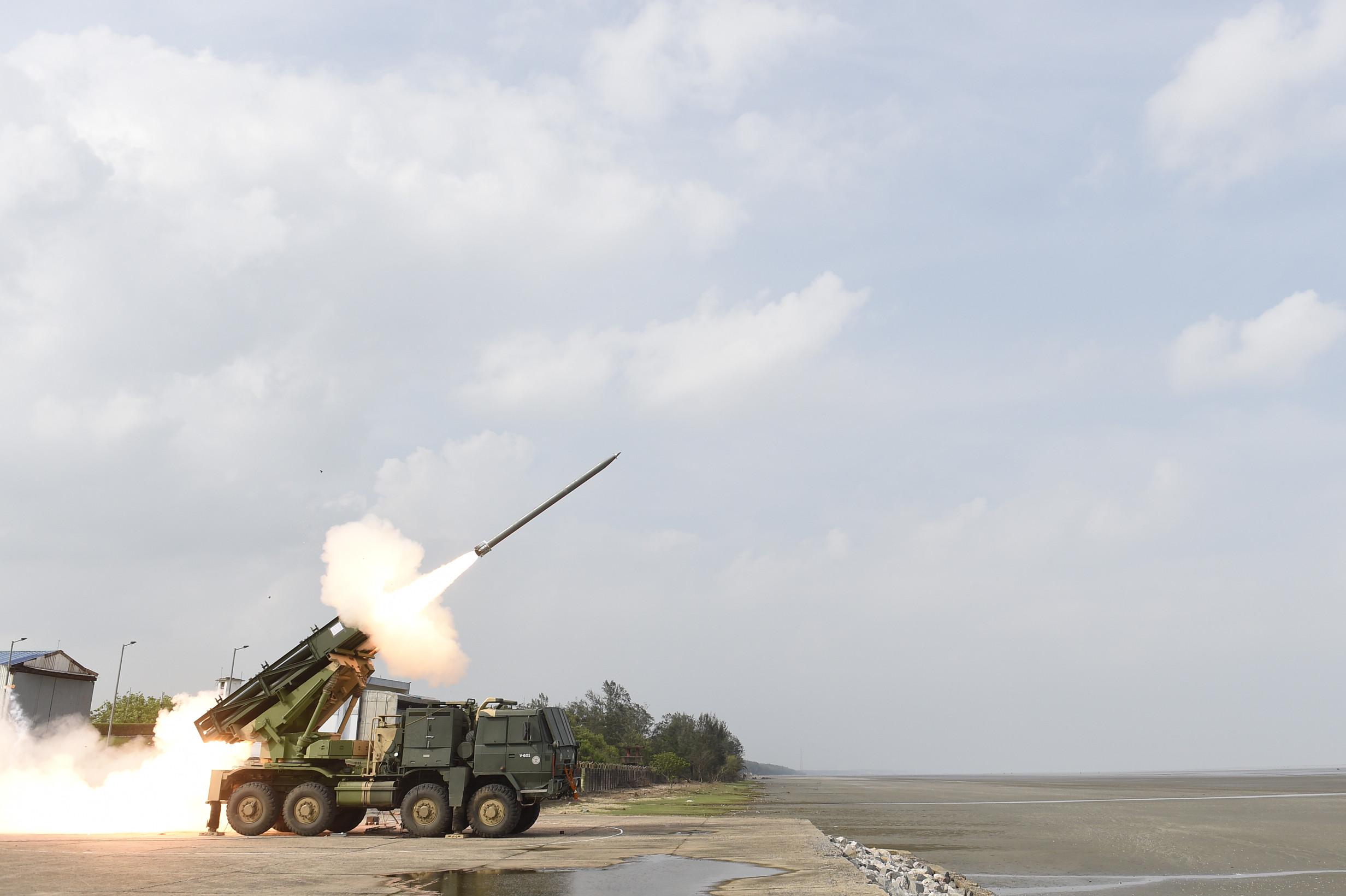
Pinaka MBRL during firing trials of an enhanced variant.

The Pinaka multi barrel rocket launcher was developed by the DRDO for the Indian Army. Development began in 1983. The Army had felt the need for a weapon system which could neutralize targets at ranges exceeding 30 km. To meet this demand, Pinaka MBRLS was developed. The project was a major program involving several DRDO Labs, Public and Private Sector Firms. This was one of the first major projects involving the Private sector. L&T and Tata have been given orders worth Rs. 390 crores

The system comprises a free-flight artillery rocket with different types of warheads & fuzes, a multi-tube launcher vehicle, a replenishment-cum-loader vehicle, a replenishment vehicle and a command post vehicle. The system is capable of firing in salvo mode within 48 sec, neutralizing an area of 700 x 500 m. The Pinaka was successfully used in Kargil War against Fortified Pakistani Positions in the mountains. The Army has placed an order for 6 regiments, with one already operational.

==== Arjun 120 mm gun ====
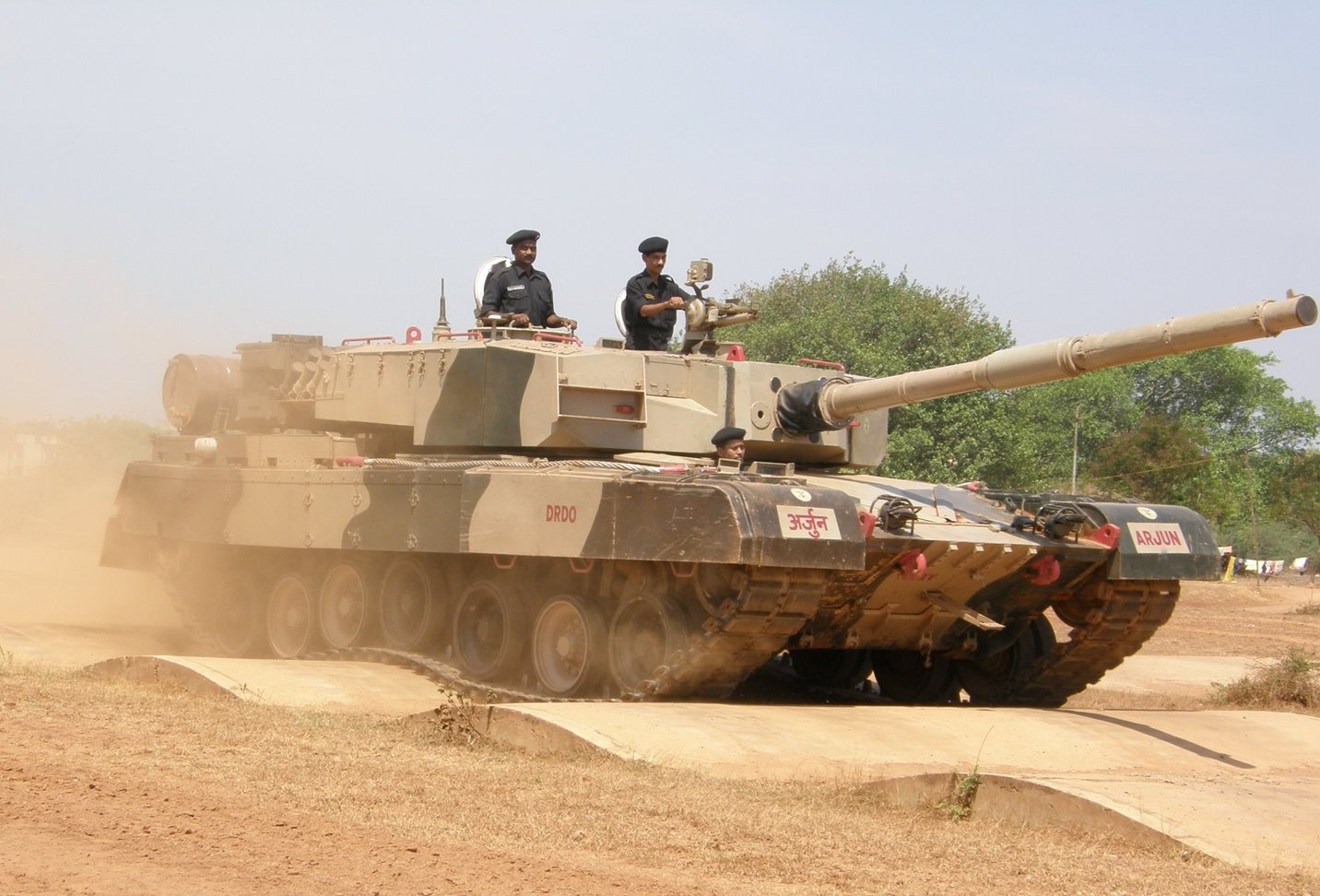
Arjun MBT

The Arjun MBT's 120 mm main gun is a rifled gun developed and tested by ARDE for use with the Arjun tank. The gun is one of the few rifled tank guns in modern tanks (like the Challenger 2). It is capable of firing rounds at velocities over 1650 m/s, and can sustain pressures of up to 612 MPa.

ARDE has also developed the Ammunition system for the gun, with FSAPDS being the primary kinetic energy round used. The Arjun can also use HEAT, HESH and other rounds, as well as being able to fire the LAHAT Anti-tank missile The armament and ammunition system are under current production at OFB.

==== DRDO ATAGS ====
The project for the development of DRDO Advanced Towed Artillery Gun System of calibre 155mm/52 involved ARDE.

=== Others ===
==== Ejection seat ====
ARDE has developed an ejection seat for HAL Tejas military aircraft. The British Martin-Baker ejection seat used for initial prototype is planned to be replaced with a locally developed alternative.

==== Canopy Severance System ====
The Canopy Severance System (CSS) is intended to save the pilot as quickly as possible in both in-flight and on-ground crises. Instead of using the canopy jettisoning method, which has the significant drawback of taking up crucial time needed for pilots to safely evacuate from damaged aircraft, the CSS is based on ejection through the canopy severance mechanism. ARDE and High Energy Material Research Laboratory are working together to develop the CSS for HAL Tejas, HAL HJT-36 Yashas, and HAL HTT-40. It replaced the imported systems from USA and Russia.

The feasibility study started in 1992. The development work was completed in 1998 and is primarily tied to HAL Tejas before it is intended for use in other aircraft in service with the Indian Armed Forces. One of CSS's features is that it can also be controlled from outside the aircraft in the case of a crash landing or when the pilot is incapacitated from injuries. The ejection success rate has been enhanced to 99.9% from prior 95%. The CSS was used in the assembly of the HAL Tejas TD-1, TD-2, and PV-1 aircraft with successful trials in 2005. It received certification from Bengaluru's Institute of Aerospace Medicine by 2011.

CSS has two distinct sub-systems. The Ground Egress System (GES) for on-ground emergencies, which is separate from seat ejection, and the In-flight Egress System (IES) for in-flight emergencies, which is integrated with the seat ejection operation. The CSS for HAL Tejas and trainer aircraft were tested successfully at Martin-Baker in UK, and NPP Zvezda in Russia. The Regional Centre for Military Airworthiness in Pune has approved the CSS design, while the Centre for Military Airworthiness and Certification has granted type approval. Third-party quality assurance during the entire development as well as in production thereafter has been supplied by Office of the Regional Director, Aeronautical Quality Assurance (Armament), Pune. It is under Directorate General of Aeronautical Quality Assurance (DGAQA), Ministry of Defence.

In CSS, the time to sever the canopy is lowered to 20 milliseconds, from more than 1,500 milliseconds, giving a clean-cut on the canopy, offering a safe passage to the Pilot and the ejection seat. A portion of the gas pressure from the seat ejection initiation is tapped and fed into the Pressure Actuated Initiator. This creates a detonation wave that passes through Explosive Transfer Lines, Junction Boxes, and ultimately the Shaped Miniature Detonating Cord, which weakens and cuts the canopy's acrylic bubble linearly near the center line. The movement of the ejection seat creates a path for the pilot and seat to safely eject, discarding the fragments of the weakened acrylic canopy bubble. The clean-cut is achieved using ARDE developed power cartridges that function with exact timings and pressure.

ARDE and HEMRL has handed the technology to GOCL Corporation, and Premier Explosives Limited, which has already supplied 8 units of CSS as of 2021. The CSS has been incorporated on 25 units of HAL Tejas, 12 units of HAL HJT-36 Yashas, 2 units of HAL Tejas Trainer and Naval LCAs, and 2 units of HAL HTT-40 aircraft. All aircraft are now undergoing test flights with CSS installed as of 2021. Within four years, HAL has asked GOCL to produce and provide 105 CSS sets for HAL Tejas and 75 CSS sets for HAL HTT-40 aircraft. In 2022, GOCL obtained a purchase order from Hindustan Aeronautics Limited to deliver CSS valued ₹19 crore (US$2 million). By 2025, GOCL Corporation will manufacture and provide 75 CSS sets for HAL HTT-40 aircraft and 105 CSS sets for HAL Tejas.

The CSS dependability in Fighter Aircraft Escape System was successfully tested utilizing HAL Tejas forebody in December 2025, at a regulated speed of 800 km/h. The test was conducted at Terminal Ballistics Research Laboratory in association with HAL, and Aeronautical Development Agency.

==== Daksh robot ====
Daksh is an electrically powered and remotely controlled robot used for locating, handling and destroying hazardous objects safely.

==== Extended Range Anti-Submarine Rocket (ERASR) ====
In the 2020s, ARDE worked with the High Energy Materials Research Laboratory and the Naval Science and Technological Laboratory to create ERASR, an extended range version of the RGB-60 rocket that was previously employed in the RBU-6000 and its Indian equivalent, Indigenous Rocket Launchers (IRL). With its twin motor propulsion system, ERASR can launch the rocket 500–8,900 m (1,600–29,200 ft) in both short-range and long-range modes. On April 3, 2023, the rocket was successfully test fired from INS Chennai (D65).

The Indian Navy finished the ERASR user trials from the IRL aboard INS Kavaratti (P31) between June 27 and July 3, 2025. During the trials, 17 rockets at various ranges were successfully fired. Every trial goal, such as range performance, electronic time fuze operation, and warhead functioning, was successfully proved. The rocket system is being produced in collaboration with Solar Defence & Aerospace Limited and Bharat Dynamics Limited. The ERASR System is anticipated to be introduced by the Navy shortly.

==== Railgun ====
A small, road-transportable railgun model that is prepared for field testing was displayed at Aero India 2025. It consists of a railgun, modular capacitors, lithium cell batteries, and a 15 kW diesel engine that can charge the battery in half an hour. The capacitor gets charged to 10 megajoules using the battery's energy. With a monolithic armature, the railgun harnesses the energy to propel the bullet to muzzle speeds of more than 2,000 meters per second. Each of the 25 modular capacitor power banks in the system has a 400 kilojoule storage capacity. At a pace of three rounds per minute, the railgun can fire thirty rounds. The rails have a lifespan of over 50 shots.

By 2022, ARDE had successfully created a 10 megajoule railgun with a bore diameter of 12 to 45 mm that could fire projectiles up to 1 kg in weight. In 2025, a projectile weighing around 50 kg can be fired by the device across a distance of almost 200 km. ARDE aims to scale this technology by concentrating on railguns with energy capacity of up to 100 MJ, which might propel projectiles at velocities exceeding 2,000 m/s—possibly reaching hypersonic speeds of over 3,000 m/s.

==== Helicopter-borne turret ====
In October 2026, ARDE had shortlisted SSS Defence and Kalyani Group as industrial partners for the development of 20 mm aviation gun and turret system for HAL Rudra and HAL Prachand of the Indian Army and Air Force. The development is expected to take two years which would be followed by acceptance trials and production orders. The order execution would be split between the two firms with the lowest bidder to receive 60% of the quantity. ARDE had signed a memorandum of understanding with Hindustan Aeronautics Limited for a similar development in 2025.
