= OPEX (Stock Exchange) =

Stock exchange in Lisbon

PEX
- Type: Multilateral Trading Facility
- Location: Lisbon, Portugal
- Founded: 2003
- Owner: OPEX – Sociedade Gestora de Sistema de Negociação Multilateral, S.A.
- Key people: Luís Rodrigues (president)
- Website: http://www.opex.pt

OPEX is a Portuguese financial services company headquartered in Lisbon that consults clients regarding mergers and acquisitions, capital raising, and general operations. The firm launched an over-the-counter exchange known as PEX (abbreviation of "Prime Exchange") in 2003 to provide a trading environment for the securities of small and mid-cap Portuguese companies.

== History ==
In 2002, three former representatives of the Bolsa de Valores de Lisboa e Porto (now Euronext Lisbon), Álvaro Dâmaso, António Nogueira Leite and Luís Rodrigues (the latter being the company's president), announced that they would be creating a firm known as OPEX (short for Organização e Promoção de Mercado -- "Market Organization and Promotion"). OPEX strove to create a new stock exchange in Portugal known as PEX that would run alongside Euronext Lisbon as an alternate means of raising capital, hoping to launch in October of the same year. Though promptly registered with the Portuguese Securities Market Commission, the exchange would not be directly regulated, and much of the rules would be up to the determination of OPEX. PEX was eventually launched in 2003 with a focus on small-cap businesses and the use of an "online component" purported to increase transaction speeds according to the company's president.

In 2005, OPEX announced the creation of a subsidiary clearing house called PEXsettle to assist in the operations of PEX with plans to expand to other exchanges. In 2007, PEX became a Multilateral Trading Facility (MTF). The company also assisted in the assembly of the technological platforms of the Angola Debt and Stock Exchange in 2015.

Currently, the market is making valiant attempts to survive and attract enough liquidity. Its perseverance seems to have paid off with trading volumes showing a rising trend in the past one year.
