= Proof and Experimental Establishment =

Indian defense laboratory

Proof & Experimental Establishment
- Established: 7 November 1895; As DRDO lab in October; 1958
- Director: Shri S K Nayak
- Location: Chandipur, Balasore, 756025, Chandipur, Orissa; 21.443365°N 87.023474°E
- Operating agency: DRDO, India
- Website: PXE, DRDO

The Proof and Experimental Establishment (PXE) is an Indian defence laboratory of the Defence Research and Development Organisation (DRDO). Located in Balasore, Orissa, India. its main purpose concerns the research and development of technologies and products in the area of medium and large caliber weapons and their ammunition. PXE is organised under the Armament and Combat Engineering Cluster of DRDO.

== History ==
In March 1894, the first proof testing in India was carried out, with there being fired six inch (152 mm) Bag Loader Howitzers and 12 Pounder Shrapnel shells under the command of Captain R.H. Mahon. He recommended the creation of a dedicated department for this purpose. The Proof Department in India was sanctioned in May 1895. It was established on 7 November 1895, with headquarters at Balasore and Lt. R.T. Moorre as the head.

Later, the establishment was renamed to the Proof & Experimental Department, and later still was renamed as PXE. The establishment was organised under the Directorate General of Ordnance Factories (DGOF), India and subsequently came under the supervision of the Inspection Organisation under the DGOF. After Independence, PXE was under the administrative control of DGI up to 1958. On 15 July 1947, Lt. Col. B.N. Mitra became the first Indian to head the organisation. The establishment was brought under the administrative control of the DRDO in October 1958.

== Areas of work ==
PXE is the main non-Army Proving ground and research establishment for design and developmental trials of guns, mortars, rockets, RCL, tank guns and their ammunition, including Naval guns and ammunition. It also conducts technical evaluation trials for imported weapons and ammunition as well as R&A trials for compilation of Range Tables.

PXE also conducts performance evaluation trials for tank armour and ammunition, as well as proof of armour plates, tank turrets, ICVs, proximity fuzes, etc. and also weapons and ammunition produced by the Indian Ordnance Factories. PXE has conducted tests of the Arjun MBT Armour as well as tests of indigenous Explosive reactive armour. The lab has also conducted tests of other armaments such as the Indian Field Gun and the Pinaka Multi Barrel Rocket Launcher System.

PXE also conducts comparative propellant and ballistics parameters testing and is involved in the establishment of propellant standards, in their periodical check firing and in Quality Assurance through periodic checks of ammunition that are held in Army and Naval Depots.

=== Facilities ===
The PXE operates large test ranges. The establishment's initial land area was about 15-acre (61,000 m^{2}), that area increasing to 685-acre (2.77 km^{2}) when the range was increased in 1949 . The establishment has grown in size, in accordance with its changing role over the years. With the increased range of missiles and ordnance being tested, the test ranges have also been expanded. At present, the establishment has a notified range of 50 km in length along the sea coast and 50 km into the sea. The Range is a natural sea-based range with oscillating tide conditions. During low tide, water recedes to a distance of about 3 km into the sea beach, thus facilitating various range operations.

PXE also has test facilities for the measurement of range and accuracy of rockets and projectiles, measurement of armor protection levels, and testing of proximity fuzes. PXE also has labs to measure the ballistic characteristics - Internal, External and Terminal ballistics.

== Projects and products ==
PXE is an ISO 9001:2008 certified Organisation. Some Achievements of PXE include:

- Established high speed photography techniques for study of sabot discarding phenomena in sub caliber projectile
- Spin measurement of projectiles by Doppler Radar and High Speed Photography Technique
- Ballistic Evaluation of gun propellants by comparative as well as absolute ballistics methods.
- Measurement of Height of Burst of Proximity fuze by Photography technique
- Easy and faster method of barrel changing in T-72 Tanks
- Recovery technique of fired projectiles both over water and over wet sand
- Recording of full trajectory data of artillery projectiles
