= Indian Field Gun =

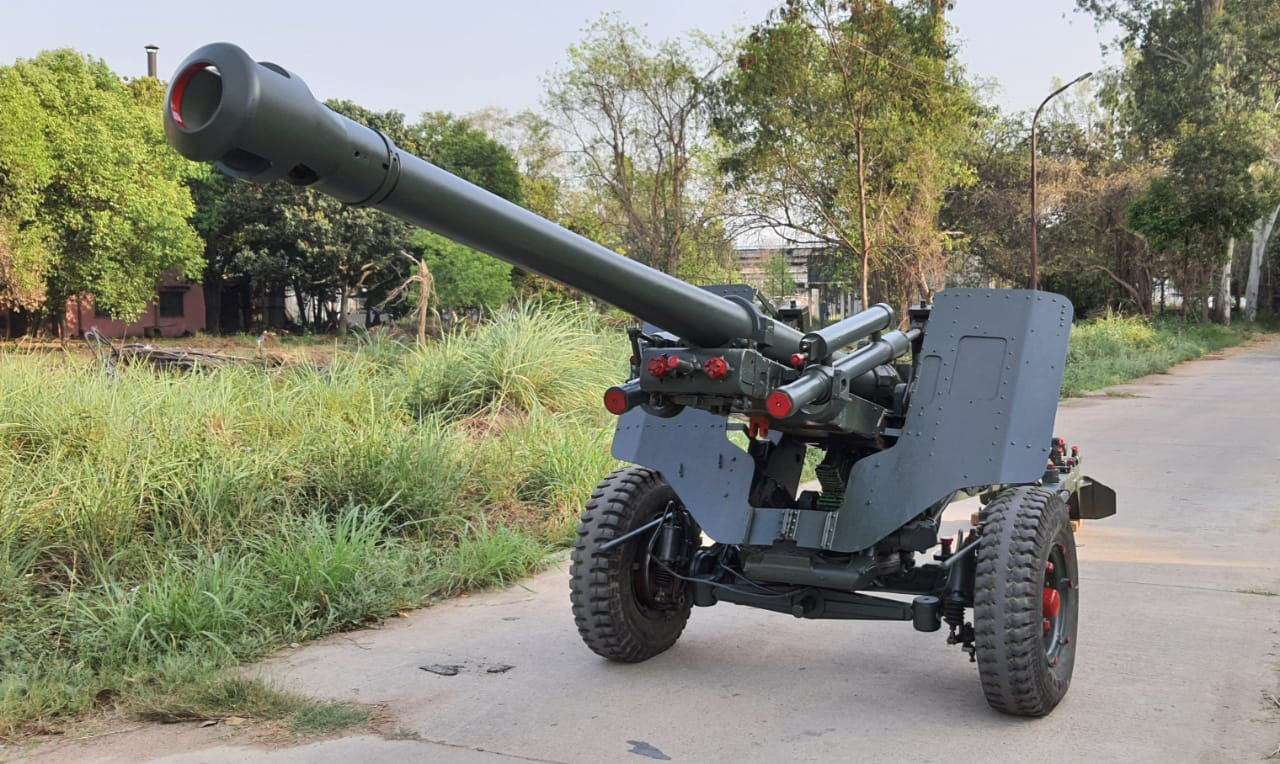
- Type: Field gun
- Place of origin: India

Service history
- In service: 1974 - present
- Used by: See Operators
- Wars: Kargil War

Production history
- Designer: Armament Research and Development Establishment
- Designed: 1972
- Manufacturer: Field Gun Factory, Kanpur (IFG); Gun Carriage Factory Jabalpur (LFG)
- Produced: 1978–? (IFG); 1984-2015 (LFG)
- No. built: 2400 LFGs (as of 2025)
- Variants: See Variants: Indian Field Gun (IFG); Light Field Gun (LFG)

Specifications
- Mass: 3,450 kg (7,610 lb) (IFG); 2,380 kg (5,250 lb) (LFG)
- Length: 5.94 m (19 ft 6 in)
- Barrel length: 2.31 m (7 ft 7 in) L/22 (IFG); 3.89 m (12 ft 9 in) L/37 (LFG)
- Width: 2.21 m (7 ft 3 in)
- Height: 1.73 m (5 ft 8 in)
- Shell: 105 × 372 mm R (HE, HESH, Illuminating, BE Smoke)
- Caliber: 105 mm (4.1 in)
- Breech: Horizontal block
- Recoil: Hydropneumatic, constant: 110 cm (43 in) (IFG); 106 cm (42 in) (LFG)
- Carriage: split trail
- Elevation: -5° to +73°
- Traverse: 5° left & right from centreline
- Rate of fire: LFG: 4 rpm (normal); 6 rpm for 10 mins (intense); 1 rpm for 2 hours (sustained)
- Muzzle velocity: 475 m/s (1,560 ft/s)
- Maximum firing range: 17,400 m (10.8 mi) (IFG); 17,200 m (10.7 mi) to 20,000 m (12 mi) (LFG)

The Indian Field Gun is a towed field gun developed in India and extensively used in the Indian Army.

== Development ==
The Armament Research and Development Establishment (ARDE) began the design and development of the gun in 1972 to replace the older 25-pounder guns used by the Indian Army. It was produced in the Gun Carriage Factory (GCF), Jabalpur from 1978 onwards. In addition to the GCF, the guns have been manufactured at Gun Carriage Factory Jabalpur.

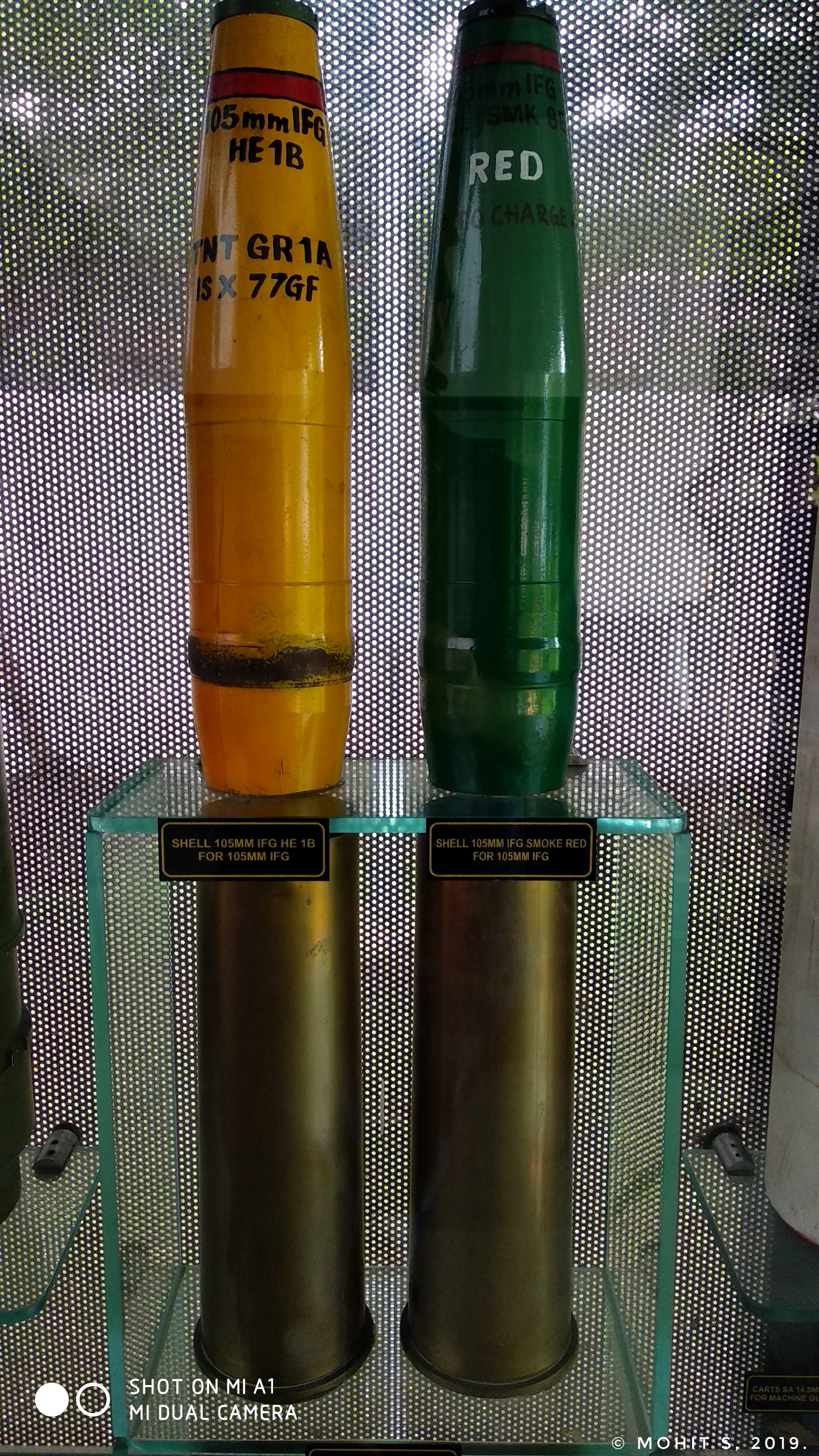
105 mm HE and smoke shell of Indian field gun

The shells are manufactured at ordnance factories in Ambajhari and Chandrapur. It shares many features with the British L118 light gun. It's suitable to operate in mountainous and other difficult terrains, because this gun has excellent portability.

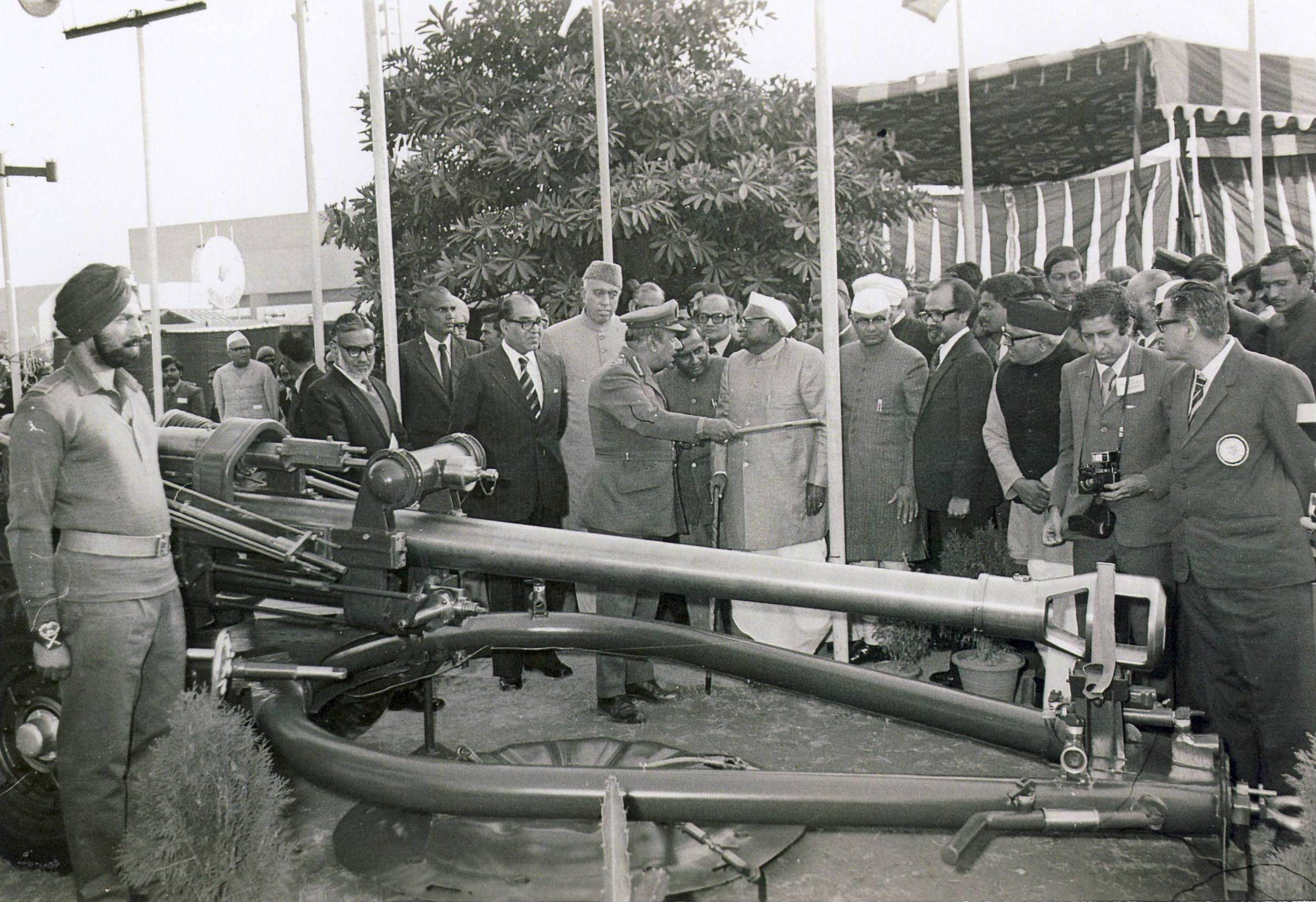
Indian Field Gun prototype being shown at the Pragati Maidan Defence exhibition, New Delhi

== Variants ==
=== Towed ===
The Indian Field Gun (IFG) weighs 3,450 kg (7,610 lb). It has a normal rate of fire of four rounds per minute over ranges from 2,000–17,400 m (6,600–57,100 ft). It can sustain an intense rate of fire of six rounds per minute for up to 10 minutes and a sustained rate of fire for up to one hour. It has a crew of six. The gun has a secondary anti-tank capability. It can operate in temperatures ranging from −27 to +60 °C (−17 to 140 °F). The recoil on firing is absorbed by two side-mounted hydraulic cylinders. A circular platform provided with the gun can be used for rapid 360° movement. Manufacture of the Indian Field Gun began in 1978. There are three variants:

- Indian Field Gun Mark 1
- Indian Field Gun Mark 2
- Indian Field Gun Mark 3

The Light Field Gun (LFG) variant weights 2,380 kg (5,250 lb), but retains the same rate of fire and range as the IFG. The LFG can be broken down into two or three parts for easy transport and quickly re-assembled. The LFG can be heli-lifted and paradropped. The manufacture of the Light Field Gun began in 1984. There are two variants:

- Light Field Gun Mark 1
- Light Field Gun Mark 2

=== Self propelled ===
- OFB 105 mm SPG – consists of a BMP Sarath hull mounted with a light field gun. It was developed by ordnance development centre, Ordnance Factory Medak, but has not been inducted into the Indian Army.
- Garuda 105 (Version 2) – a 105 mm/37 calibre LFG gun is mounted on an all terrain 4×4 wheeled chassis. This gun has all-terrain maneuverability (including high altitude). Based on the LFG, this gun has been developed by Kalyani Strategic Systems, a subsidiary of Bharat Forge.

== Operators ==
- India : 2,400 FGs in service with the Indian army. 1,700 are IFGs and 700 are LFGs. Being upgraded from manual gun-laying system to automated gun-laying system.
- Myanmar : 10 in service, provided by India.

== See also ==
- M119 howitzer
- L118 light gun
