= Gun Carriage Factory Jabalpur =

- Town

- Location in Madhya Pradesh, India
- Coordinates: 23°10′49″N 79°58′39″E
- Country: India
- State: Madhya Pradesh
- District: Jabalpur
- Established: 1904

Government
  - Body: OFB

Population (2011)
  - Total: 9,285

Languages
  - Official: Hindi
- Time zone: UTC+5:30 (IST)
- Website: ofbgcf.nic.in

Gun Carriage Factory Jabalpur, also known as GCF Jabalpur, is a defence factory and a census town in Jabalpur district in the state of Madhya Pradesh, India. Located in the scenic surroundings of the Satpura Range, this small government township is built around its namesake defence establishment. It is about 3 km from the Jabalpur City railway station, and is also closely connected to the city. It is surrounded by other defense establishments. Within the estate, there are central schools, hospitals, churches, temples and clubs.

== History ==
The Gun Carriage Factory was started in the year 1904 by the British in India. This Factory is the oldest Ordnance factory in entire Central India, apart from GCF there are Ordnance factory Khamaria, Vehicle Factory, Jabalpur and Grey Iron Foundry located in Jabalpur. This is one of the 40 odd defense manufacturing units governed by the Ordnance Factory Board. It caters to the needs of all three wings on the Indian defense forces, the Indian Army, the Indian Navy, and the Indian Air Force. Apart from the 3 Armed Forces it also caters to the needs of paramilitary forces such as CISF, CRPF, BSF, ITBP, state police etc.

GCF Jabalpur Census Town has total administration over 2,136 houses to which it supplies basic amenities like water and sewerage. It is also authorize to build roads within GCF Jabalpur Census Town limits and impose taxes on properties coming under its jurisdiction.

== Facilities ==
Schools
The estate has two central schools, also called Kendriya Vidyalayas, and a Government Higher Secondary school near Vidyanagar.

Church
This estate has one of the famous Jabalpur Church, the GCF Church.

Temples
This estate has two of the famous Jabalpur temples, the Patbaba temple and the Adi Parashakti temple GCF also known as Kali Mandir, was established in 1903, Located in madras line, this temple was renovated in May–June 2012.

Clubs
GCF Estate has one Club namely GCF Senior Club Established in 1925.

== Demographics ==
As of the 2011 Census of India, G.C.F Jabalpur had a population of 9,285 of which 4,862 are males while 4,423 are females.

Males constitute 52.36% of the population and females 47.64%. The population of children within the age group of 0-6 is 833 which is 8.97 % of total population. The, Female-Male sex ratio is 910 against the state average of 931. Moreover, the child sex ratio is around 924 compared to the state average of 918. G.C.F Jabalpur has an average literacy rate of 84%, higher than the national average of 69.5%.

The literacy rate of GCF Jabalpur city is 90.84 % higher than the state average of 69.32 %. Here, the male literacy is around 94.58 % while the female literacy rate is 86.73 %.

== Products ==
Products

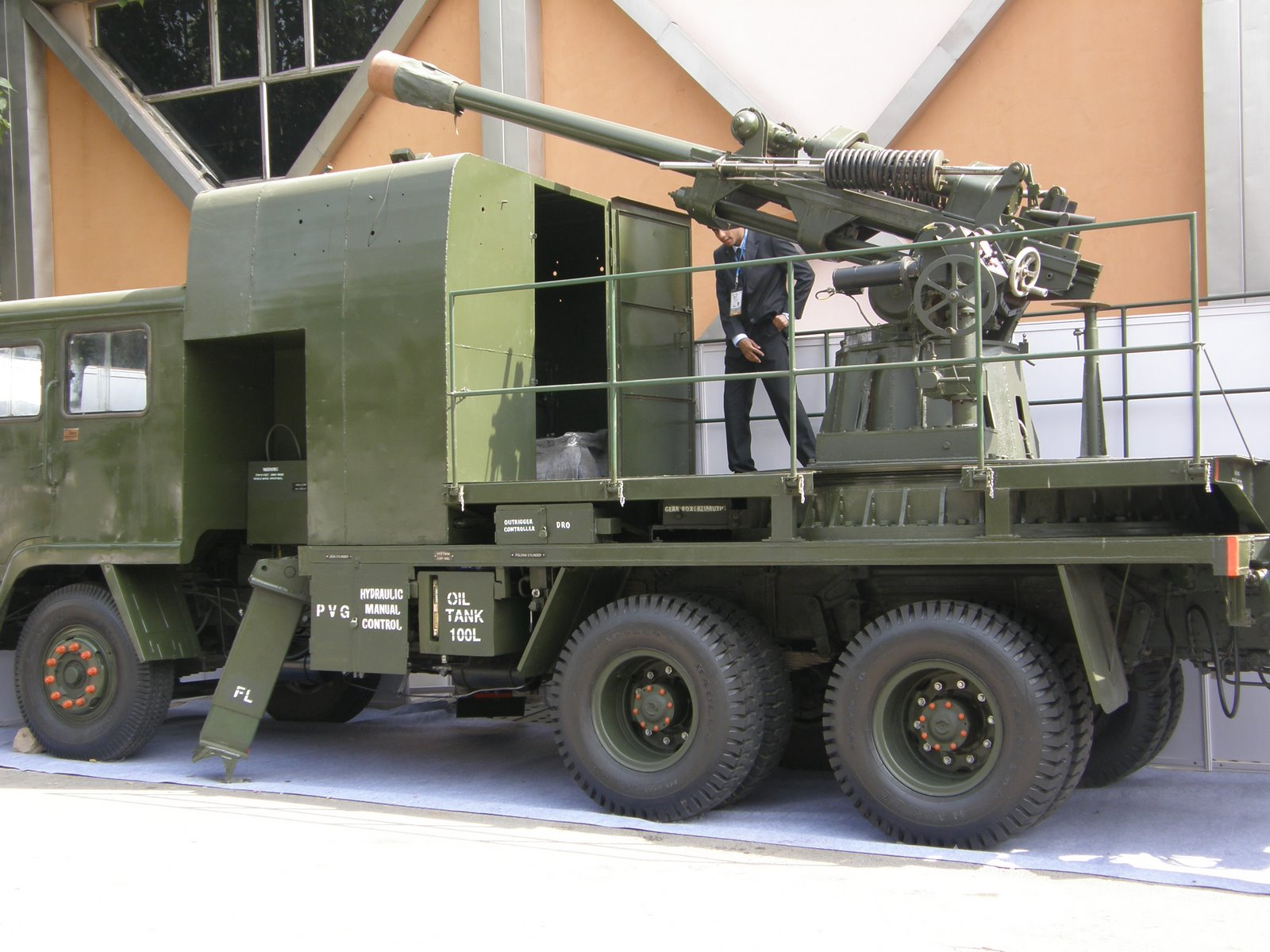
VFJ-GCF 105 mm Truck-mounted Self-Propelled Gun System, in 6X6 and 4X4 configurations

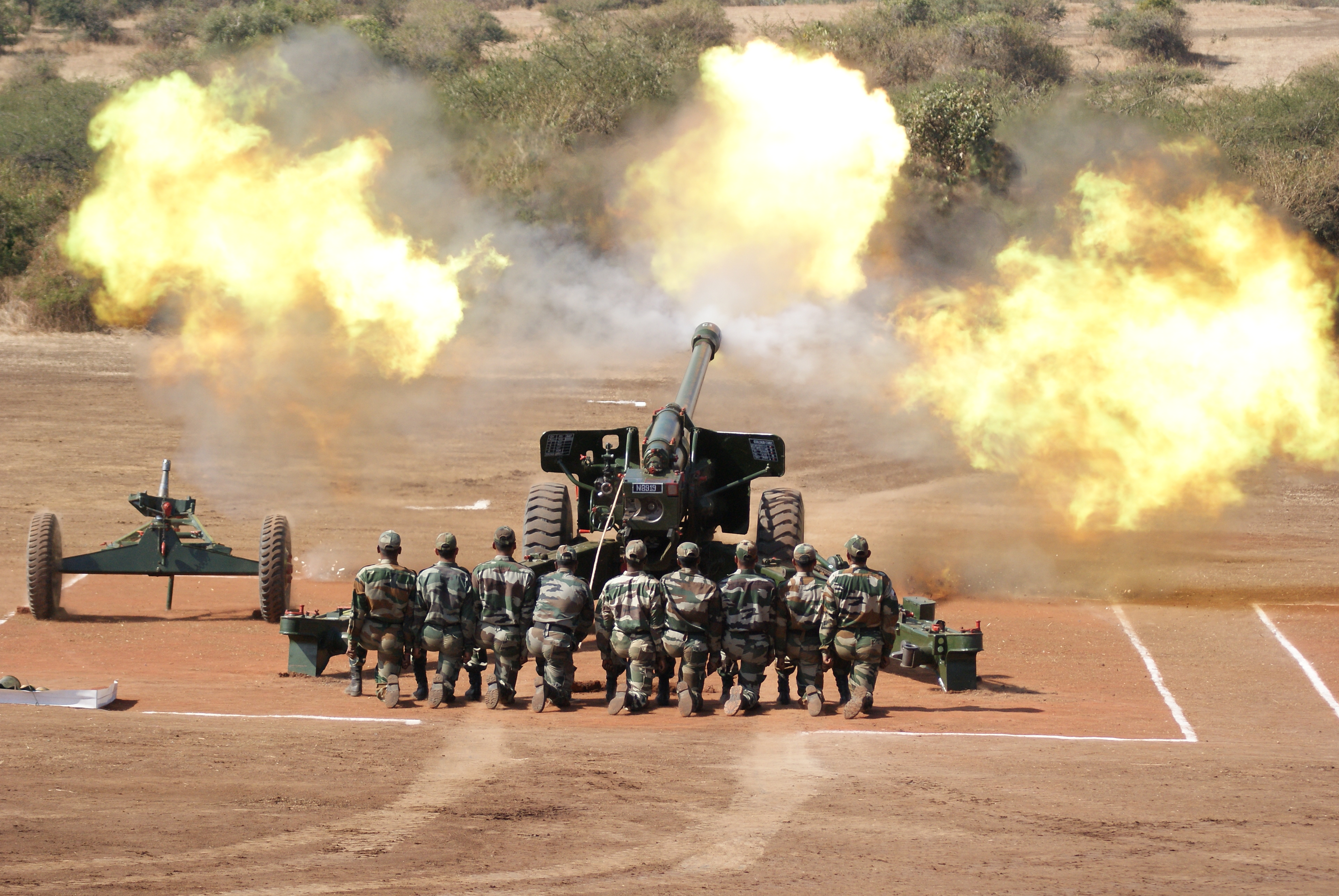
VFJ-GCF Sharang Towed Gun

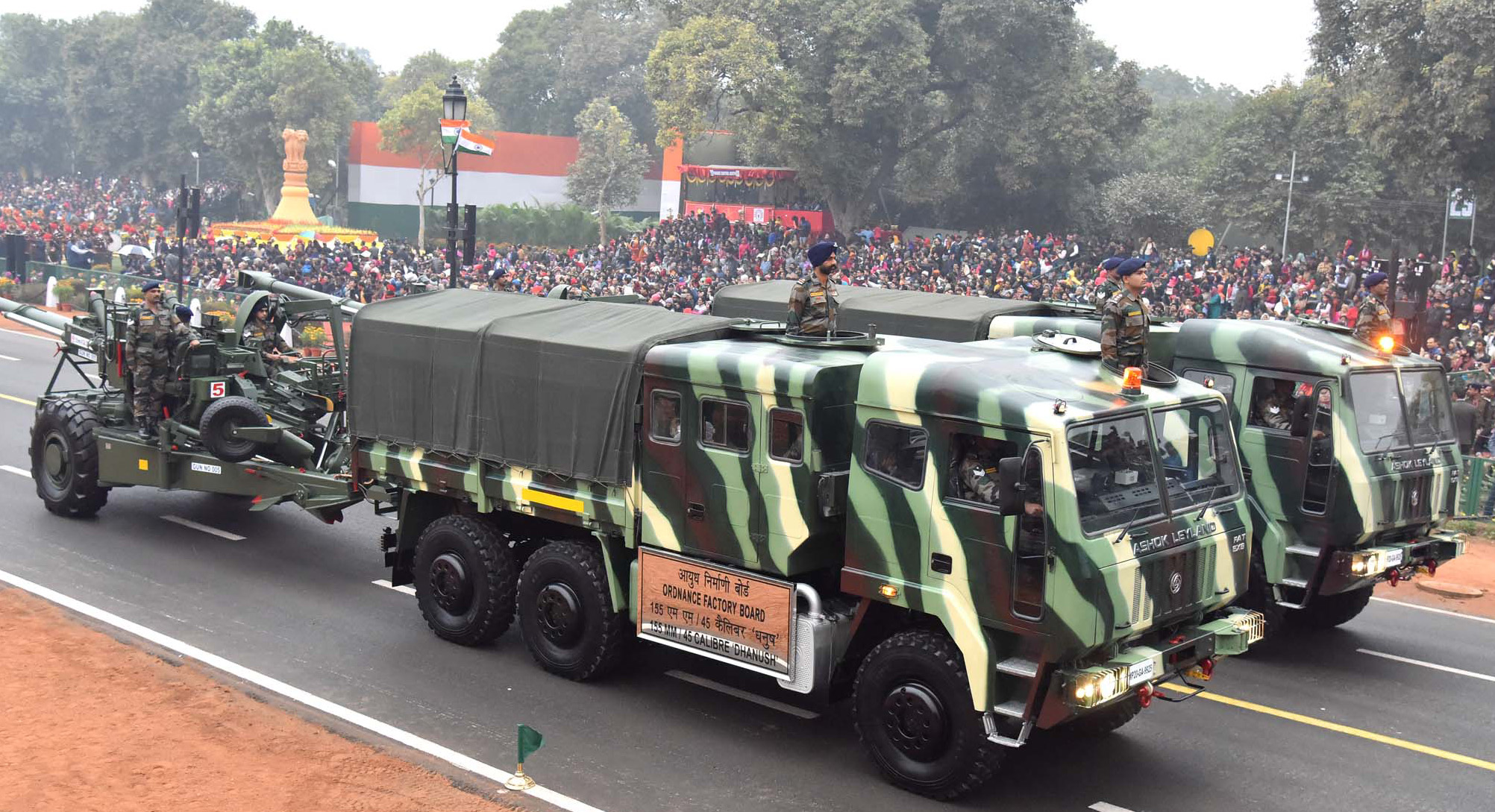
Dhanush howitzer manufactured at GCF and its tractor at VFJ

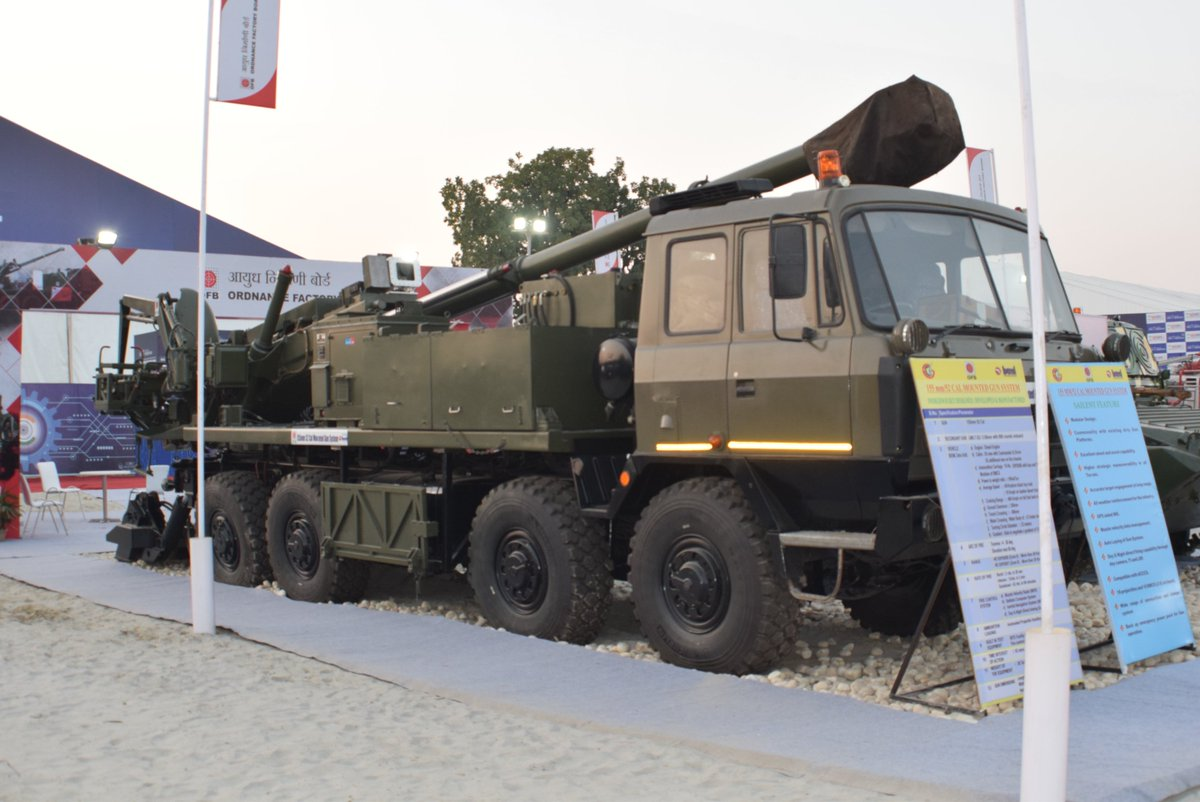
VFJ-GCF 8X8 155 mm Truck-mounted Self-Propelled Gun System
