= Economy of Indore =

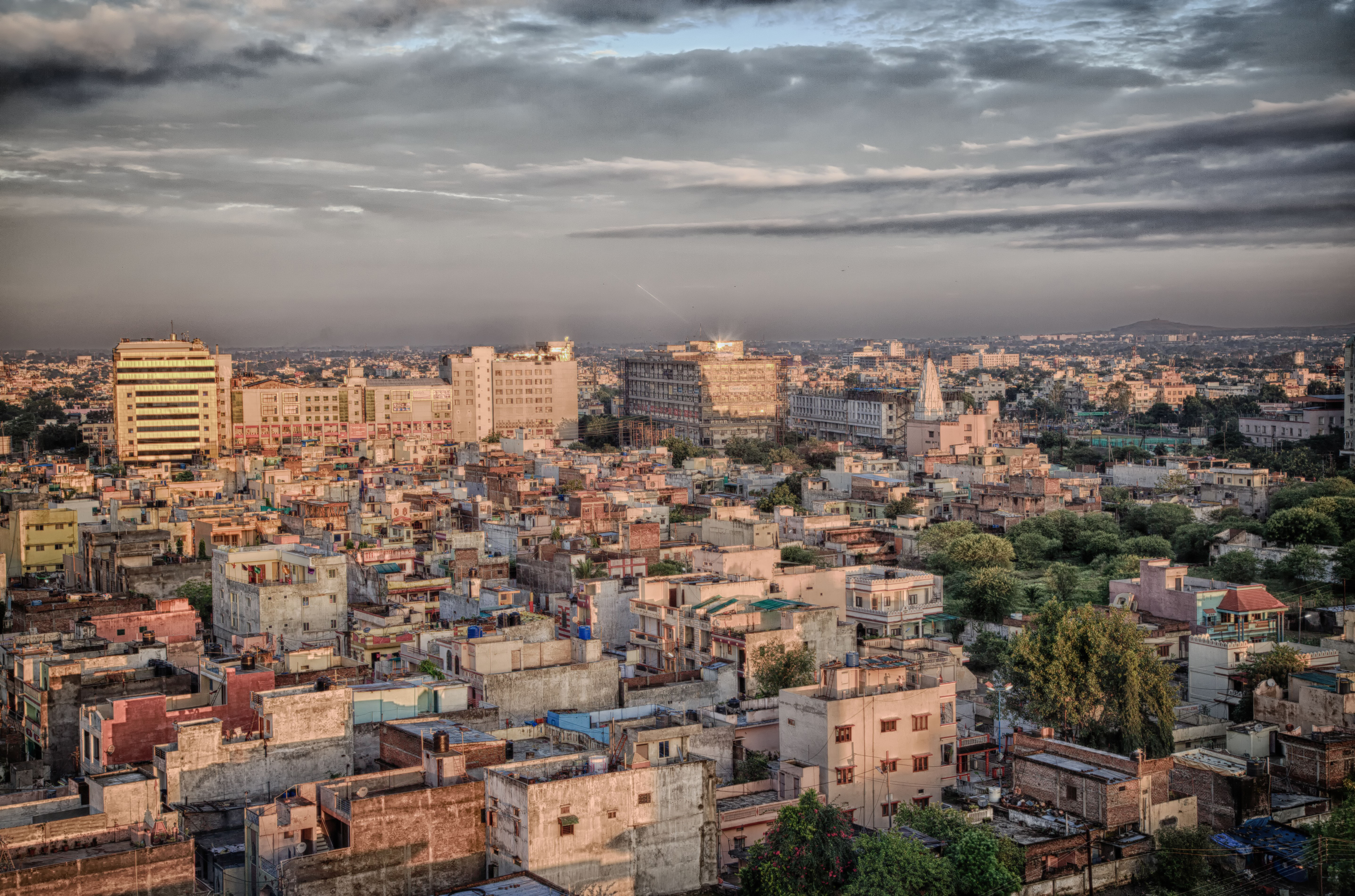
The skyline of Indore.

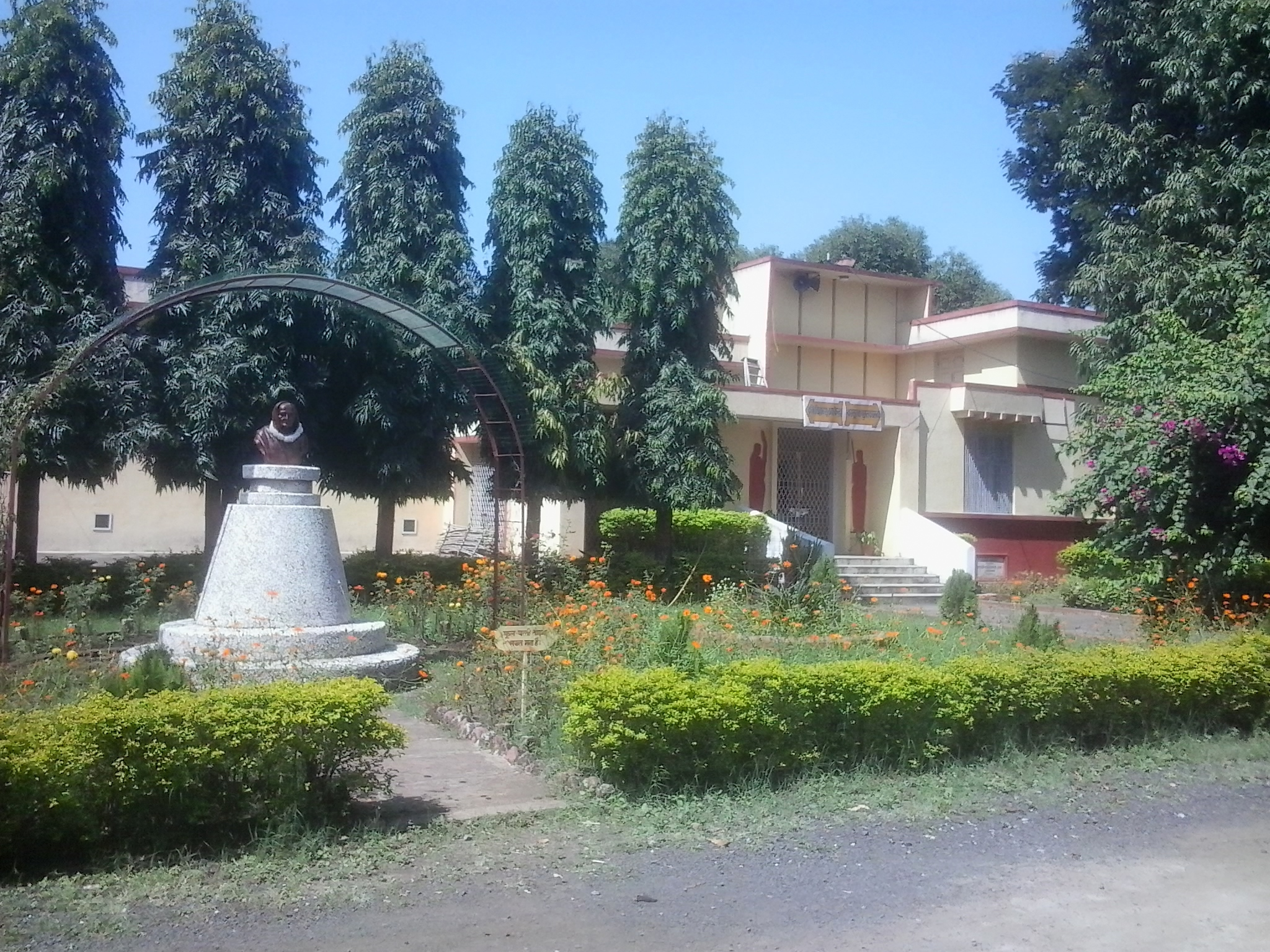
Kasturbagram Rural Institute, Indore office

The economy of Indore is notable for its importance in the areas of trading, finance and distribution in Madhya Pradesh. Indore has the largest economy in Madhya Pradesh and is the business and trading capital of the state. Pithampur Industrial Area, near Indore houses more than 1200 industrial units. Pithampur is a part of Indore Metropolitan Region, though its economic contributions are not accounted in Indore District. Located at the crossroads of western and central India, Indore has relatively good connectivity and has been the hub of trade and commerce, not only for the state but also for western India. Cotton textiles are the city's major product, but iron and steel, chemicals, and machinery are also manufactured there. The textile industry is in decline and is being replaced by a variety of new manufacturing industries. Still it is one of the largest textile industries in India. Old-time industries which flourished in Indore were handloom, hand dyeing, manufacture of niwar, oil extraction by ghani, manufacture of bamboo mats, baskets, metal utensils, embossing and engraving of gold and silver ornaments, shellac industry, etc. Ayurvedic and Unani medicines from roots and herbs were manufactured under state patronage. Indore has one of the largest trans-shipment centers for truck transport.

Apart from textile industry, Indore has oil seed extraction industry, confectionery, paper and straw board, factories for asbestos products, RCC pipes and poles, machine tools and accessories, electrical machinery and appliances, electronics goods, bicycles and ready-made garments. Indore accounts for about one third of the total ‘namkeen’ (variety of gram flour snacks) production of India. Due to its trade and industry, the residents of the city refer Indore as Mini Bombay.

Indore Urban Agglomeration had estimated 3.30-lakh workers in 1991. The workforce increased from a size of 1.13 lakh in 1961 recording an average annual growth rate of 3.64% per annum during 1961–1991. The workforce participation rate was 28.9% in 1991 and 30% in 2001. It remained almost static between 1981 and 1991 in percentage terms. The maximum growth (68.6%) took place during the decade 1971-1981 followed (51.2%) during 1981–2001.

Indore's CBD is the largest in state and also has plenty of surrounding commercial areas which are considered part of Indore. A notable one is Pithampur, which is also known as the Detroit of Madhya Pradesh.

Indore city extends over the Vijay Nagar, forming East Indore, a continuation of the CBD. Indore has a large economy; however it tends to have a high vacancy rate. Just a few kilometres north of Vijay Nagar. Indore economy is expanding in all directions and it includes both the traditional agro industries and modern corporate and IT companies. One of the busiest cities of Madhya Pradesh, Indore is the economic nerve center of the state. With the flourishing of Indore economy, a number of management and engineering schools have been opened in Indore in order to supply the growing demand of professionals.

== Financial centre ==
Indore is well established as the corporate and financial capital of central India. It is also an important financial centre in the Delhi Mumbai Industrial Corridor. The city is home to the headquarters of the Madhya Pradesh Stock Exchange and also serves as the regional headquarters for numerous multinational corporations. With a bulk of its trade coming from small-, mid- and large-scale manufacturing & service industries, Indore's function as the state's commercial capital, its economic base and population size have created development opportunities for many other businesses oriented to local or more diversified markets. Industries in Indore include automobile, pharmaceutical, software, retail, textile trading and real estate. The city hosts the Global Investors' Summit which attracts investors from 21 countries, including the US, Australia, Japan, Singapore, the UK, Germany and Finland.

== Banking industry ==
Indore is the economic nerve center of Central India and therefore banks in Indore also enjoy a certain degree of importance. The banks in Indore plays a number of roles and the presence of a number of industries in Indore has raised the level of capital investments in the banks. Proportionate to the economic importance of Indore there are a number of banks in Indore which includes both public sector Indore banks and private sector Indore banks.

The State Bank of Indore now State Bank of India is the most important bank in Indore. Earlier known as the Bank of Indore Ltd, this bank in Indore was a subsidiary body of the State Bank of India. The State Bank of Indore covered a wide range of activities of investments and deposits. Besides the SBI there are a number of other public sector banks in Indore, some major banks include:

- Bank of India
- Export Credit Guarantee Corporation
- Hindu Nagrik Co-Operative Bank
- The Saraswat Co Operative Bank
- Transport Co-Operative Bank
- Union Bank of India
- Vidhya Sagar Sahakari Sansthan
- Bank of Maharashtra
- Canara Bank
- Dena Bank
- Punjab National Bank
- State Bank of Hyderabad

Apart from the public sector banks there are a number of private sector banks in Indore who are also an integral part of the banking system in Indore. The most popular private sector banks in Indore include:

- IndusInd Bank
- ICICI Bank
- HDFC Bank
- IDBI Bank
- AXIS Bank

== Industries ==
A major component of the Indore economy, industries in Indore contribute a considerable amount of revenue. The city has emerged as a major industrial center of the state of Madhya Pradesh.

Pithampur near Indore is one of the largest hubs of vehicle and automobile industries in India. Well known industrial houses have opened factories and plants in Indore. Some of the most important Indore industries are :

- Kinetic Honda
- Onida Saka
- Prestige Group
- Bajaj Tempo
- Bridgestone
- Eicher Motors
- Larsen & Toubro
- Hindustan Motors
- Crompton Greaves
- Cipla
- Piramal Healthcare
- Ranbaxy Laboratories
- RackBank Datacenters
- Dinclix GroundWorks

The Raja Ramanna Centre for Advanced Technology has been established in Indore to bolster technological research and advancement.

== Investments ==
- Pune-based Indian multinational Bharat Forge Limited company eyeing customers based in Pithampur, is all set to open its unit in the Indore region. The company plans to start the first phase of its manufacturing unit in Betma with an estimated cost of `150 crore on 68 acres of land by 2014. They envisage to increase the investment to `1000 crore by 2016.
- Several IT services companies have a presence in Indore: these include, IBM India, Computer Sciences Corporation, YASH Technologies, Impetus, Cyber Infrastructure and Premier Biosoft.
- Infosys is setting up a new development center at Indore at an investment of Rs 100 crore in phase one at the super corridor.
- Tata Consultancy Services and Collabera also announced their plans to open campuses in Indore. The government of MP has also done the land allotment.
- Accenture, LTIMindtree, and Nagarro also setup their offices in Vijay Nagar, Indore.

== See also ==
- Economy of Madhya Pradesh
- Madhya Pradesh Stock Exchange
- Global Investors' Summit
