= Economy of Madhya Pradesh =

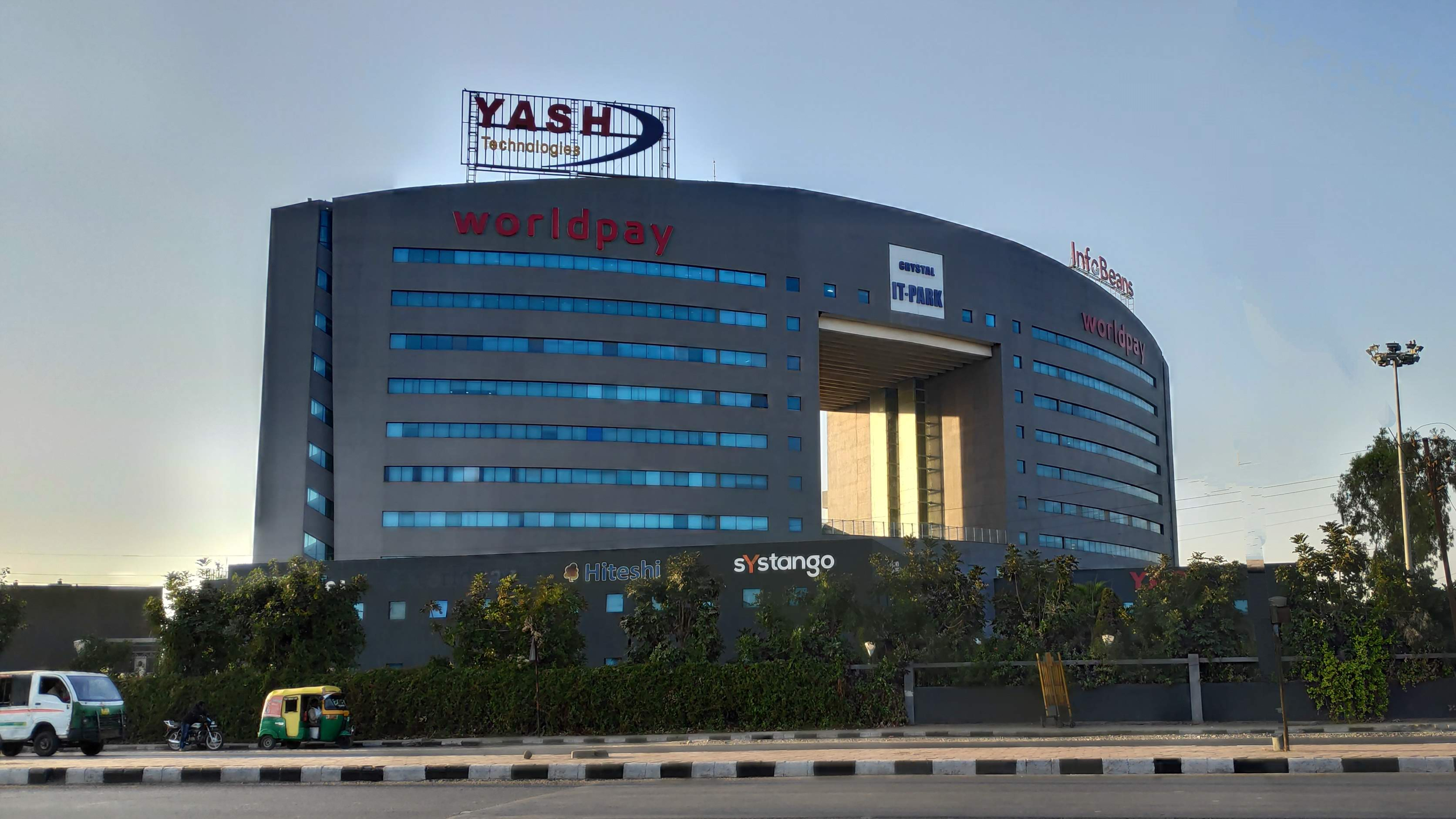
- IT Park, Indore
- Fiscal year: 1 April – 31 March

Statistics
- GDP: ▲₹18.48 lakh crore (US$190 billion) (2026-27 est.)
- GDP rank: 10th
- GDP growth: 9.6% (2024-25)
- GDP per capita: ▲₹216,523 (US$2,200)nominal(2026-27) ▲$11,344 (ppp,2025est.)
- GDP per capita rank: 25th
- GDP by sector: Agriculture 47% Industry 19% Services 34% (2020-21)
- Population below national poverty line: 20.63%
- Labour force by occupation: Agriculture 62% Industry 5% Services 33% (2015)
- Unemployment: ▼2.1% (Feb 2022)

Public finance
- Government debt: 33.31% of GSDP (2022-23 est.)
- Budget balance: ₹−62,564 crore (US$−6.5 billion); 4.11% of GSDP (2024-25 est.)
- Revenue: ₹2.63 lakh crore (US$27 billion) (2024-25 est.)
- Spending: ₹3.26 lakh crore (US$34 billion) (2024-25 est.)
- All values, unless otherwise stated, are in US dollars.

The Economy of Madhya Pradesh refers to the economic growth with respect to the Indian state of Madhya Pradesh. It grew 12% in GDP for the year of 2011–12, for which it received an award from the President Pranab Mukherjee in January 2013 for improving its tourism, medical and infrastructural growth. The economy of Madhya Pradesh is significantly agrarian which is reflecting rapid strides towards industrial and service sectors as well. The Indore, Bhopal and Jabalpur districts are the top 3 districts in terms of highest output generation in the state's economy.

== Macro-economic trend ==
The following is a table showing the trend of the gross state domestic product of Madhya Pradesh at market prices estimated by Ministry of Statistics and Programme Implementation with figures in the millions of Indian Rupees.

Year	Gross State Domestic Product
1980	77,880
1985	139,050
1990	304,720
1995	478,410
2000	737,150
2005	1,044,850

Since its partition in 2000, the new Madhya Pradesh state produces about 70% of the output of the old Madhya Pradesh state – the rest is produced by Chhattisgarh. The state's debt was estimated at 51 percent of its GDP by 2005.

== Agriculture ==
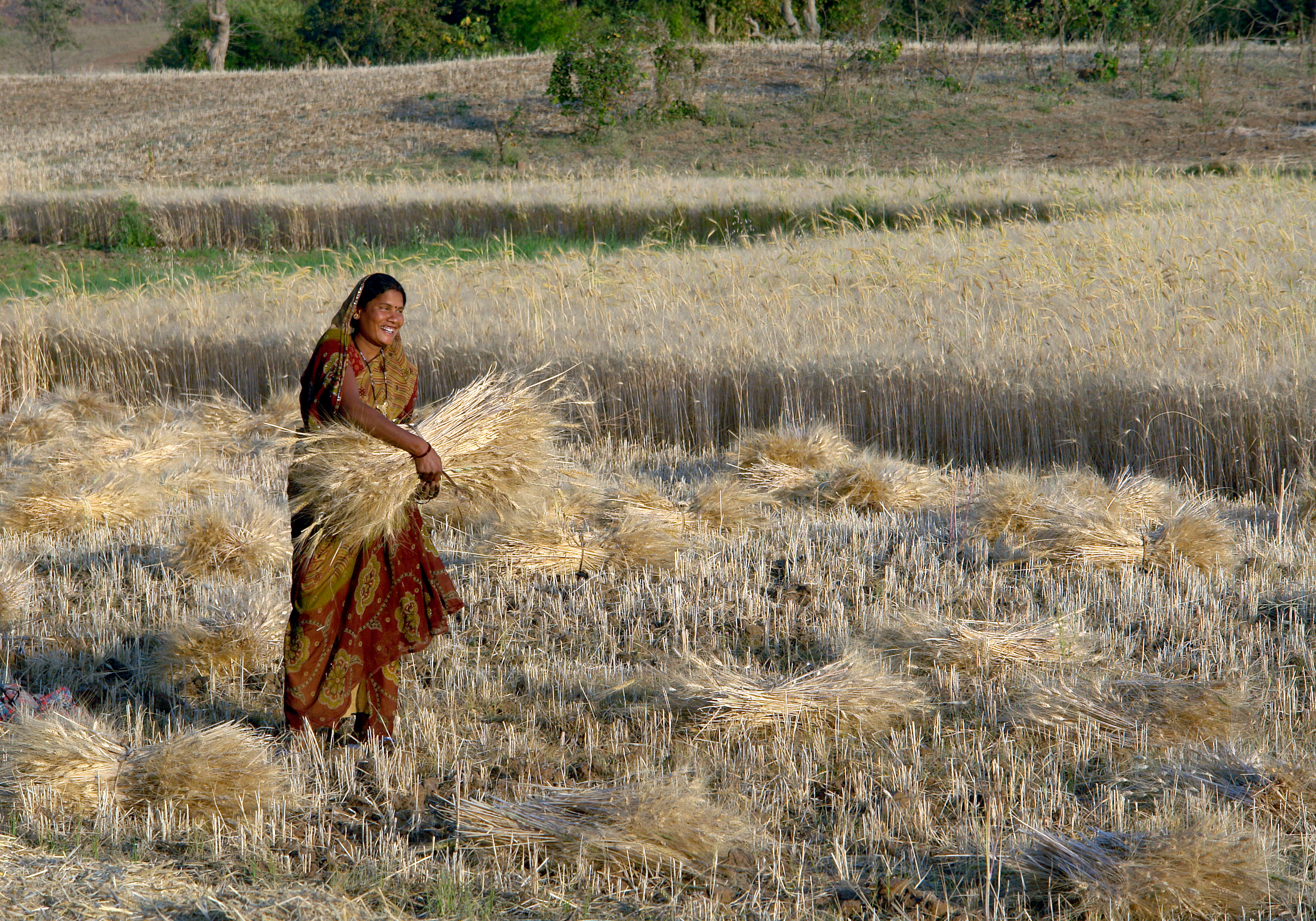
Woman harvesting wheat, Raisen district

This is a chart of | Soybeans || 90% |- | Grams || 36% |- | Oilseeds || 25% |- | Pulses || 24% |- | Food grains || 8% |}

== Industry ==
Matang was completely developed and manufactured by VFJ.

Until 2005, there was only one S&P CNX 500 conglomerate with its corporate office in Madhya Pradesh viz. Ruchi Soya Industries (2005 gross income Rs 49,661 million). Now there are many big industries based in the state. State-run NTPC will invest about Rs 20,000 crore to set up a 3,960-megawatt (Mw) coal-based power project in Madhya Pradesh and has signed a memorandum of understanding with the state government and MP Power Trading Company regarding this

== Minor forest produce ==
MFP from the forests, such as Tendu leaves used to roll bidis, sal seed, teak seed, and lak are a major contributor to the rural economy of the state. MFP-PARC (Minor Forest Produce - Processing & Research Centre) is located in the state capital - Bhopal. MFP-PARC is a unit of MP Minor Forest Produce (Trading & Development) Co-operative Federation Limited."Vindhya Herbals" is the brand of various ayurvedic, herbal & fruit products produced by MP MFP Federation. Apart from MFP-PARC, these products are also produced in Rehti (Sehore district), Barman (Narsinghpur district), Katni, Panna & Dewas in Madhya Pradesh. Some more processing centers are in the pipeline.

== Economy of leading districts ==
As per the official data released by the Directorate of Economics and Statistics (Madhya Pradesh) the districts of Indore, Bhopal, Jabalpur, Gwalior, Chhindwara, Ujjain, Sagar and Dewas constitute top 8 leading districts to the larger economy of Madhya Pradesh. The following is the estimated Gross District Domestic Product at Current Prices (Nominal GDP) basis, as released by the Directorate of Economics and Statistics (Madhya Pradesh) for the year 2020-21

=== Indore ===
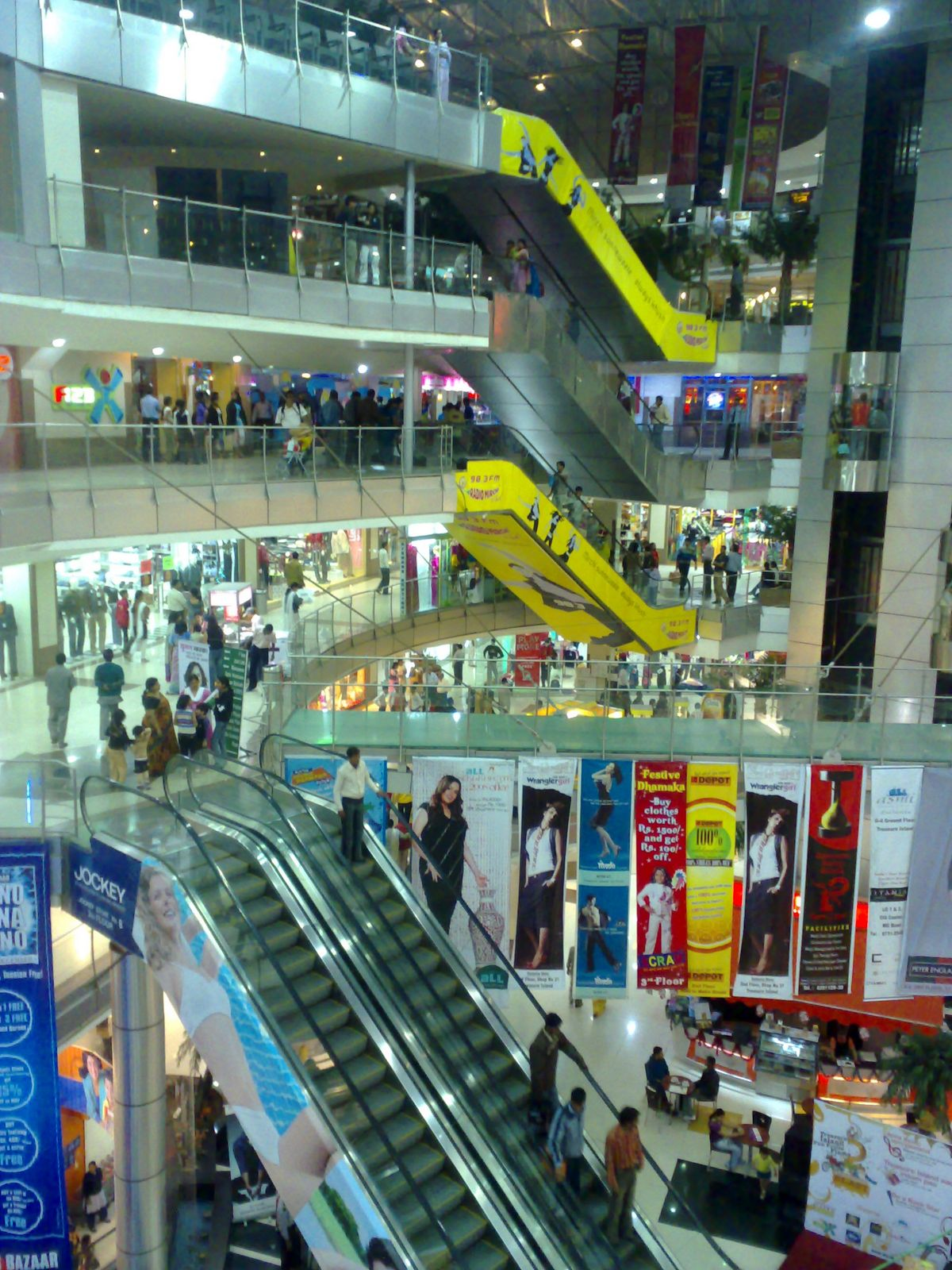
Treasure Island, a shopping mall in Indore.

Indore is the commercial capital of Madhya Pradesh with a bulk of its trade coming from large, medium, and small scale manufacturing and service industries. These industries range from automobile to pharmaceutical, from software to retail, and from textile trading to real estate. Major industrial areas surrounding the city include the Pithampur Special Economic Zone and the Sanwer Industrial belt. While textile manufacturing and trading are the oldest contributors to the economy, real estate has emerged very fast in past few years. National real estate players including DLF Limited, Omaxe, Sahara, Parsvnath, Ansal API and Emaar MGF have already launched their residential projects in Indore. These projects are generally on the Indore bypass. This road also houses the projects of many local and regional real estate players like Silver spring, Kalindi, Milan Heights, etc. Major software firms in Indore include Worldpay, Impetus, and Computer Sciences Corporation. Also, many small and medium-size software development firms are also established. In the software front, a major event occurred in the first half of 2011 when India's biggest software company Tata Consultancy Services decided to open a campus in Indore. The Government of MP has also done the land allotment. Infosys, the country's second-largest information technology services company, plans to set up a new development centre in Indore at an investment of Rs 100 crore in phase one. Pithampur near Indore houses production plants of various pharmaceutical companies like Ipca Laboratories, Cipla, Lupin, Glenmark, and Unichem.

The nominal GDP of Indore District was estimated at Rs. 64,813 crores for the year 2020–21.

=== Bhopal ===
Bhopal, the capital city of Madhya Pradesh is named after Raja Bhoj and is the second-largest city in the state both in terms of population and in terms of area. Initially its economic growth stalled because of the Bhopal Gas Tragedy but has now started growing again. Its economy is mainly based on industries. It is an important industrial center of the state. Electrical goods, cotton, chemicals, and flour milling are the main source of economy. Zardozi and embroidery of Bhopal's old city is also famous. The district is highly urbanised with nearly 80% of the population marked as urban. Now being a metropolitan city, many Software/IT sector companies are setting up offices in the city. Bhopal is also an important tourist place with the following destinations near the city:

- Birla Mandir, Bharat Bhavan, Kamla Park, Kilol Park, Lal Ghati, Van Vihar are very interesting places in Bhopal
- Bhojpur Temple (28 km away) : Archeological site of the Pre Paleolthic era.
- Bhimbetka rock shelters (45 km away): Archeological site of the Paleolithic era. A UNESCO World Heritage Site.
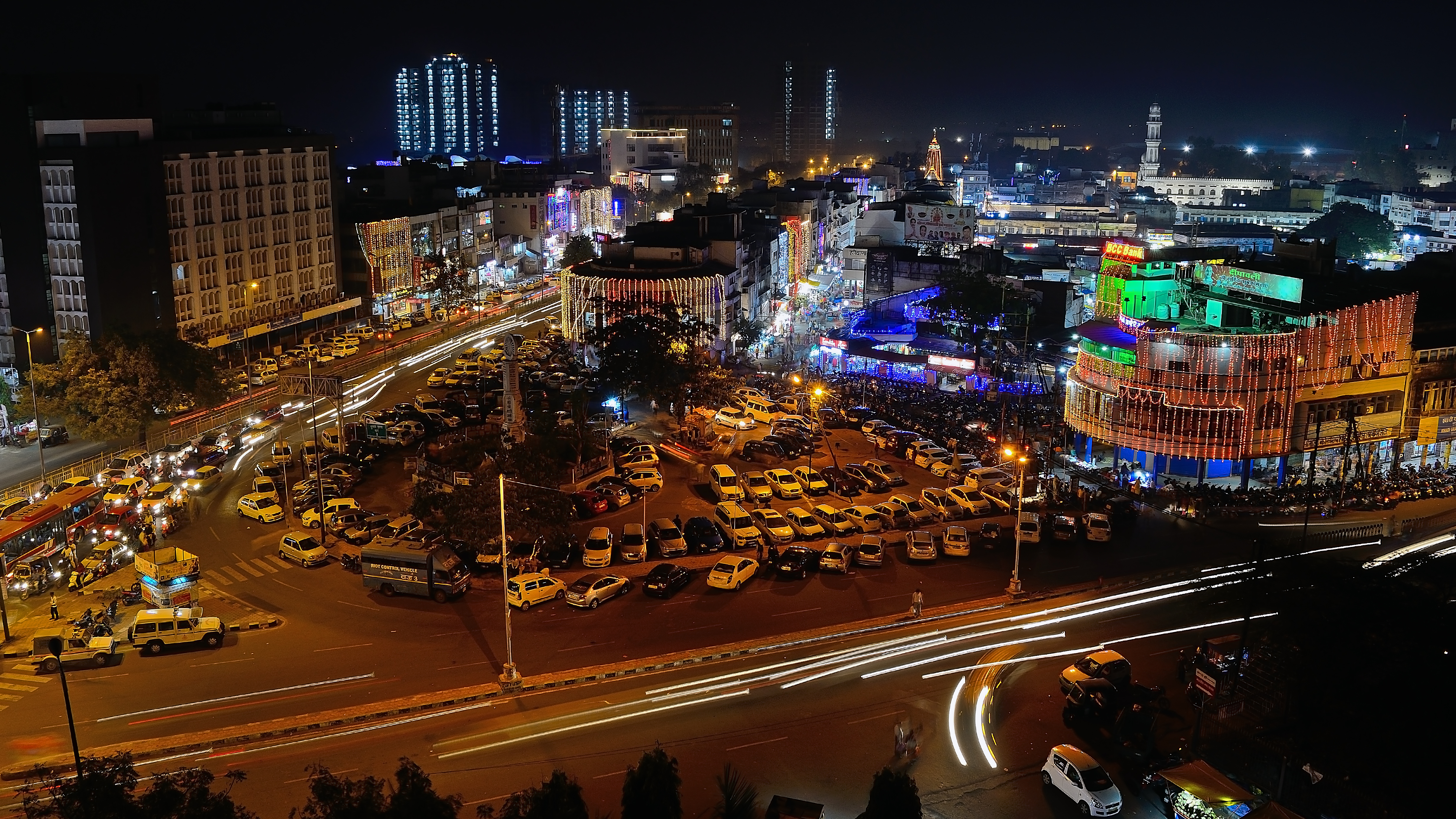
  A colorful view of New Market Bhopal on the eve of Deewali
- Sanchi Stupa (46 km away): A Buddhist Stupa commissioned by the emperor Ashoka the Great in the 3rd century BC

The industrial area of the city includes four zones marked by the state government for the promotion of the manufacturing capacity of the city. The largest zone is the Mandideep Industrial Area situated at the national highway connecting Bhopal and Nagpur. Mandideep houses numerous pharmaceutical, manufacturing, automobile, and textiles companies which include HEG Limited, Procter & Gamble, Lupin Limited, Eicher Tractors, Insulators and Electricals Limited, etc. The other industrial zones around Bhopal include Bagroda AKVN, Tamot Plastic Park and Acharpura Textile Park with the close proximity of Bhopal Airport. While the economic and industrial zones within the city boundaries include Govindpura Industrial Area, Bharat Heavy Electricals Limited (BHEL), and Bhopal IT Park. In 2020, Volvo Eicher opened its new plant in Bhopal, while IT Giant Wipro expressed its intention to open its new Software Development Centre in Bhopal. A land has already been allotted to the Wipro Group for the establishment of the Azim Premji University Bhopal, which will be second of its type in the entire country after Bengaluru. While India's first multi-skills park known as Global Skills Park is situated within the city. The Skills Park is the first of its kind project in India, making Bhopal a highly preferred destination in terms of the generation of a skilled workforce, in consonance with the industry demands. Bhopal has been consistently ranked number one in the implementation of the Smart City Project in India. Due to the advantage of its location, Bhopal is considered by the investors to be the topmost investment destination for logistics hubs, along with the booming real estate market of the city. Bhopal is also home to well-known educational institutes in India and has a prominent healthcare infrastructure.

The nominal GDP of Bhopal district was estimated at Rs. 44,175 crores in 2020–21.

=== Jabalpur ===
The Narmada river bringing in freshwater from the Vindyachal Ranges has developed Jabalpur district into an agrarian economy. The land of the Narmada basin with its fertile alluvial soil gives good yields of sorghum, wheat, rice, and millet in the villages around Jabalpur. Important among commercial crops are pulses, oilseeds, cotton, sugar cane, and medicinal crops. The state is poised for a breakthrough in soybean cultivation. In Kharif crops occupy 60% and Rabi crops 40% area with 71.4% area under food grain production. Nearly 59% of landholders are marginal whereas small farmed share 18% of farmland. Low literacy rates (35.45%), undulating topography, high percentages of wasteland (13.2%), underdeveloped irrigation potential (23%), low groundwater utilization, a large proportion of rain-fed agriculture (75%), the practice of Kharif fallows (3.6%), low cropping intensity (131%), low fertilizer consumption (50 kg/ha), a high proportion of low-value crops, and high numbers of unproductive livestock constrain production in the state.

Jabalpur has a variety of industries largely based in mineral substances of economic value found in the district, although the ready-made garments industry is a substantial portion of production in Jabalpur.

Defence establishments started in the early 20th century. Jabalpur has Vehicle Factory Jabalpur, Grey Iron Foundry, Gun Carriage Factory Jabalpur and Ordnance Factory Khamaria which belong to the Ordnance Factories Board manufacturing various products for the Indian Armed Forces. The Gun Carriage Factory was started in the year 1904 is well equipped and manufacture gun parts, mounting, shells, and a variety of the other product for war purposes. Vehicle Factory Jabalpur (VFJ) was started as a manufacturer of trucks and other defence vehicles. The other two are Grey Iron Foundry (GIF) and Ordnance Factory Khamaria (OFK).

Armed forces make up a large portion of the city and economy in this city. The city has three regimental centres: Grenadiers, Jammu and Kashmir rifles and the Signals regiment. Jabalpur is also the army headquarters of Madhya Pradesh, Bihar, Chhattisgarh, and Orissa. Jabalpur is an important divisional headquarters, having eight districts: Jabalpur, Seoni, Mandla, Chhindwara, Narsimhapur, Katni, Dindori, Balaghat. The Jabalpur District has been reconstituted on May 25, 1998. It now has four tehsils Jabalpur, Sihora, Patan, and Kundam. Jabalpur also has the headquarters of the Madhya Pradesh State Electricity Board, Homeguards, and many other state and central government offices. There are seven blocks in the district with 1449 inhabited villages, 60 uninhabited, 1209 revenue villages, and 4 forest villages. The presence of several industries in Jabalpur bolstered the industrial scenario of the city. However, the industrial growth of the area owes much to the defense establishments and the four ordnance factories.

The presence of the military base and the ordnance factories have improved the infrastructure of the city. This has boosted the industrial development of Jabalpur. The important industries in Jabalpur are:

- Readymade garments units
- Poultry/hatchery
- Electrical goods industry
- Sawmills
- Wood cutting industry
- Industries relating to limestone products
- Building materials
- Glassware
- Telephone parts
- Furniture making industry
- Shaw Wallace Gelatin Factory
- Steel structures works
- Cement industries
- Commercial Engineers & Body Builders Co Limited [CEBBCO ]
- Tobacco business
- Retail business
- Food processing industry
- Vendors for Coca-Cola India & Parle

The nominal GDP of Jabalpur district was estimated at Rs. 58,149 crores in 2024–25.

=== Gwalior ===
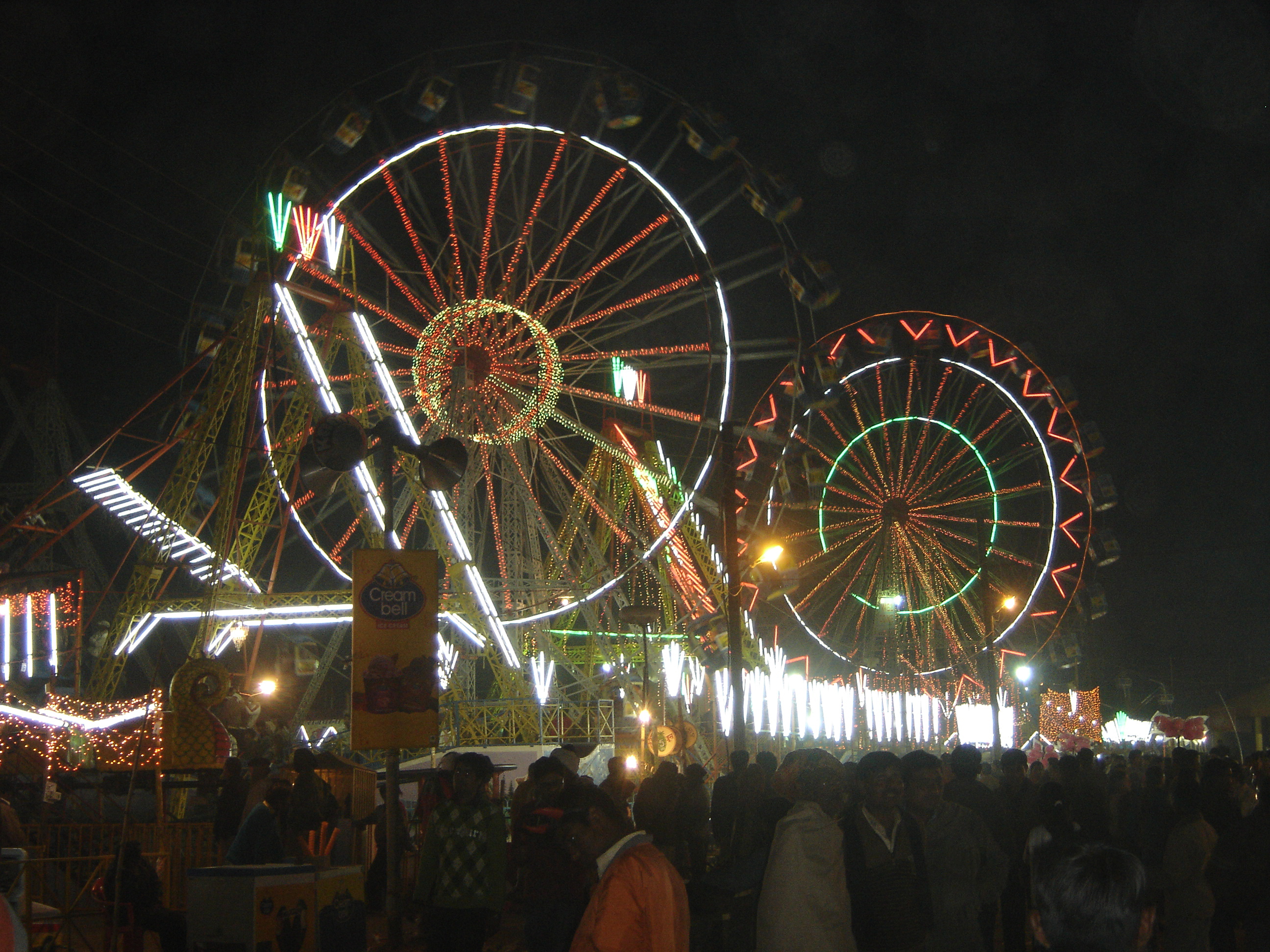
Gwalior Fair

Gwalior enjoys being at a very strategic position as being the main junction on New Delhi - Chennai railroad and being on NH-3 and NH-75. Gwalior is surrounded by 3 Industrial areas - Sitholi, Banmore and Malanpur. All these three sectors are on NH 75, National Highway 3 and NH 92 respectively. Malanpur is the biggest. The city earlier had big manufacturing industries such as Gwalior Grasim and J.C. MILLS of Birlanagar but now this sector is left with only one industry – J.B.Mangharam Ltd. But the other three sectors have many industries. The important ones are dairy, chemical, manufacturing, and textiles. Handicraft and small industries are also found such as Gwalior potteries. Gwalior is also an important historical and tourism sector of the country therefore the tourism sector also puts an effect into the city's economy. Gwalior trade fair is an annual trade fair showcasing the economy of Gwalior. The nominal GDP of the Gwalior district was estimated at Rs. 33,084 crores in 2020–21.

=== Chhindwara ===
Chhindwara enjoys the strategic location of situated at between Jabalpur and Nagpur connecting highway. Chhindwara is home to brands like Raymond's, Adani Wilmar & Hindustan Unilever. The city has rich market areas such as Mansarover Complex, Fawwara Chowk, Nagpur Road, Gole Gunj & Gandhi Gunj. Looking the spending capability of the local population all major automobile brands have made their presence in the city. Apart from this Parasia area is known for its coal fields and majority of population in this region is associated with Western Coalfields Limited for their employment. The district's economy is primarily run by the presence of coal mines. Western Coalfields Limited is the major company of Chhindwara approximate ten thousands people work together here. n September 2008 CII inaugurated first of its kind National Center of Excellence for Skill Development catering to the need of skilled workforce for the Indian industry. Companies such as Punj Lloyd, JCB India Ltd. and Toyota Kirloskar Motors (TKM) are imparting training in trades. The nominal GDP of the district was estimated at Rs. 33,407 crores in 2020–21.

=== Ujjain ===
Ujjain is the largest city in Ujjain district of the Indian state of Madhya Pradesh. It is the fifth largest city in Madhya Pradesh by population and is the administrative centre of Ujjain district and Ujjain division.

An ancient city situated on the eastern bank of the Kshipra River, Ujjain was the most prominent city on the Malwa plateau of central India for much of its history. It emerged as the political centre of central India around 600 BCE. It was the capital of the ancient Avanti kingdom, one of the sixteen mahajanapadas. It remained an important political, commercial and cultural centre of central India until the early 19th century when the British administrators decided to develop Indore as an alternative to it. Ujjain continues to be an important place of pilgrimage for Shaivites, Vaishnavites and followers of Shakta.

Ujjain has been selected as one of the hundred Indian cities to be developed as a smart city under PM Narendra Modi's flagship Smart Cities Mission. The nominal GDP of the district was estimated at Rs. 33,576 crores in 2020–21.

=== Sagar and Bina ===
Bina refiniry by bpcl 1st centrol india refiniry Agriculture forms the backbone of the Sagar economy. Many districts completely rely on the income generated from agriculture taken up in the city. The farmers use the latest technologies pertaining to the sector of agriculture so that a healthy crop is obtained. A strong agriculture economy has led to an improvement in the living standards of people living in the city of Sagar. The chief crops grown here are chickpeas, wheat, oilseeds, and soghum. is also into poultry farming, animal husbandry, dairy farming, fisheries, forestry, and cattle fairs. With many proposed large and small scale industries, the economy of Sagar is bound to grow at a fast pace. It is also a major hub for useful minerals. The stainless steel complex is also in Sagar. The lakha banjara lake in the centre of the city provides a wonderful panorama. Dr. Hari Singh Gour central university First and one of the oldest universities of Madhya Pradesh established in 1946 is in Sagar. Due to its scenic beauty and proximity to Khajuraho tourism also contributes to strengthening its economy. In Madhya Pradesh, Sagar is the sixteenth largest district in size. These small scale industries mainly manufacture steel utensils, detergent cake, and powder, agricultural equipment, welding electrodes, plastic goods, alum, caustic soda, solvent plant, granitbillie stone, pipes, acrylic sheets, PVC cable, acrylic products, incense sticks, all-purpose flour, etc. Bidi (A traditional Tobacco used in India) making is one of the most traditional and eminent businesses in Sagar and is done almost all over Sagar. The nominal GDP of the district was estimated at Rs. 30,517 crores in 2020–21.

=== Dewas ===
In recent years, the modern industry has taken off in Dewas in a big way. The growth is the industry sector has given jobs to local factories. At the same time, traditional crafts / Handicrafts as Mojri (Shoes), Synthetic Carpets, leather works (begs, belts, ladies' purses, shoes, coats, briefcases, etc.) remain important in the economy. Agriculture (especially Soybean, wheat, gram) is also the source of the economy. Many high tech industries have been set up for oil extraction from Soyabean. To control the Indian economy, BANK NOTE PRESS, a Central Government Organization for the printing of Indian Currency is also situated here. The nominal GDP of the district was estimated at Rs. 26,439 crores in 2020–21.

=== Rewa ===
The economy of the Rewa district in Madhya Pradesh is characterized by its strong cement industry, including the Jaypee Rewa Cement Plant, and its agricultural sector, which focuses on crops like soybeans. While the region boasts significant natural attractions like the rare white tigers, waterfalls such as Chachai Falls and Bahuti Falls, and historical sites, its economy is still developing. In 2019-20, the Rewa district reported a Gross Domestic Product (GDP) of Rs. 24,87,214 lakhs at current prices.

== Foreign trade ==
The major merchandise exports from Madhya Pradesh during the year 2021 were:

HS Code	Commodity	Value in INR	Number of countries to which state exports the products
30049099	OTHER MEDCNE PUT UP FOR RETAIL SALE N.E.S	₹ 65,59,14,09,913	160
76011010	ALUMINIUM INGOTS-NOT ALLOYED	₹ 29,99,84,40,380	18
23040010	OIL-CAKE AND OIL-CAKE MEAL OF SOYA BEAN EXPELLER VARIETY	₹ 22,40,41,97,046	27
23040030	MEAL OF SOYABEAN, SOLVENT EXTRACTED (DEFATTED) VARIETY	₹ 20,54,49,57,081	43
52010015	INDIAN COTTON OF STAPLE LENGTH 28.5MM (1.4/32) AND ABOVE	₹ 16,79,97,36,374	11
63053200	FLEXIBLE INTERMEDIATE BULK CONTAINERS OF MAN MADE TEXTILE M	₹ 13,25,09,24,644	69
10063020	BASMATI RICE	₹ 12,48,00,04,289	52
63026090	TOILET LINEN AND KITCHEN LINEN, OF TERRY TOWELLING OR SIMILA	₹ 10,17,23,00,102	33
52052410	GREY2401	₹ 7,81,02,49,377	35
85451100	ELECTRODES OF A KIND USED FOR FURNACES	₹ 7,73,87,30,751	38

In fiscal year 2021–22, MP's merchandise exports hit a record level of over 60k Crore INR (nearly $8 Billion) up from $6.38 Billion in 2018-19
