= Madhya Pradesh Global Investors' Summit =

Biennial business summit in India

Invest Madhya Pradesh: Global Investors Summit
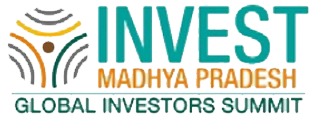
- Frequency: 2 years
- Location: Indore
- Inaugurated: 2007
- Most recent: 2019
- Previous event: 2019 (as Magnificent MP Summit)
- Next event: 2021
- Participants: 6,000
- Patron: Government of Madhya Pradesh
- Organiser: MPAKVN Indore, Confederation of Indian Industry
- Website: https://invest.mp.gov.in/

Global Investors Summit (GIS), officially the Invest Madhya Pradesh Global Investors Summit, is a biennial business summit organized by the Government of Madhya Pradesh in Indore, to attract domestic and foreign investment for development of the state.

== See also ==
- Government of Madhya Pradesh
- Economy of Madhya Pradesh
