= Madhya Pradesh Stock Exchange =

Stock exchange in India

- Type: Stock Exchange
- Location: Indore, India
- Founded: 1919
- Owner: Government of India
- Key people: Pawan Agarwal (ED)
- Currency: Indian rupee (₹)
- No. of listings: 315

Madhya Pradesh Stock Exchange (MPSE) was a stock exchange located at Indore, Madhya Pradesh, India. It was a SEBI recognized Permanent Stock Exchange, until its de-recognition in 2015. Established in 1919, it was 3rd oldest stock exchange in India, and a leading stock exchange under outcry system.

== History ==
MPSEL was originally set up as an association in 1919, with around 150 broking members. It was granted permanent recognition under the provisions of the Securities Contract (Regulation) Act, 1956 ("SCRA"), by the Government of India in 1988. MPSEL currently has 185 broker members, including some of the leading brokering houses in India. Around 315 companies, including some of the leading corporates of the country are listed on MPSEL.

After joining hands with National Stock Exchange (NSE) in 2012 and with the Bombay Stock Exchange (BSE) in 2013, MPSE became the only regional stock exchange in India to provide independent trading platform for its members.

MPSE was the first regional exchange to enter into agreement with both the stock exchanges and first in India to get SEBI's approval when it allowed regional exchanges to come out of hibernation. Prior to this trading at the MPSE was allowed through its subsidiary.

In 2014, SEBI asked MPSE to create its own trading platform with a net worth of ₹ 100 crore or be de-recognized. SEBI de-recognized MPSE in 2015.

== Timeline ==
Following is the timeline of the Madhya Pradesh Stock Exchange history.

- 1919 - Incorporated as Association of Person.
- 1957 - Recognized as Regional Stock Exchange.
- 1988 - Ministry of Finance granted permanent recognition.
- 1992 - MPSE records highest turnover.
- 2006 - MPSEL was corporatized into a limited company.
- Aug 2007 - MPSE demutualized at a premium of Rs. 30/- per share.
- 2008 - Sratagic Investors have taken up 51% stake at the Exchange.
- 2009 - Auction of two trading membership rights at record price of Rs. 3.81 lacs and Rs. 3.51 lacs.
- 10 Apr 2010 - Agreement under section 13 with National Stock Exchange (NSE).
- 31 Mar 2011 - Approval of Securities and Exchange Board of India (SEBI) to NSE agreement.
- 1 May 2012 - Agreement under section 13 with Bombay Stock Exchange (BSE).
- 9 June 2015 - SEBI Exit Order in respect of Madhya Pradesh Stock Exchange Ltd (MPSE)

== See also ==
- List of South Asian stock exchanges
- List of stock exchanges in the Commonwealth of Nations
