= Gwalior trade fair =

Trade fair in India

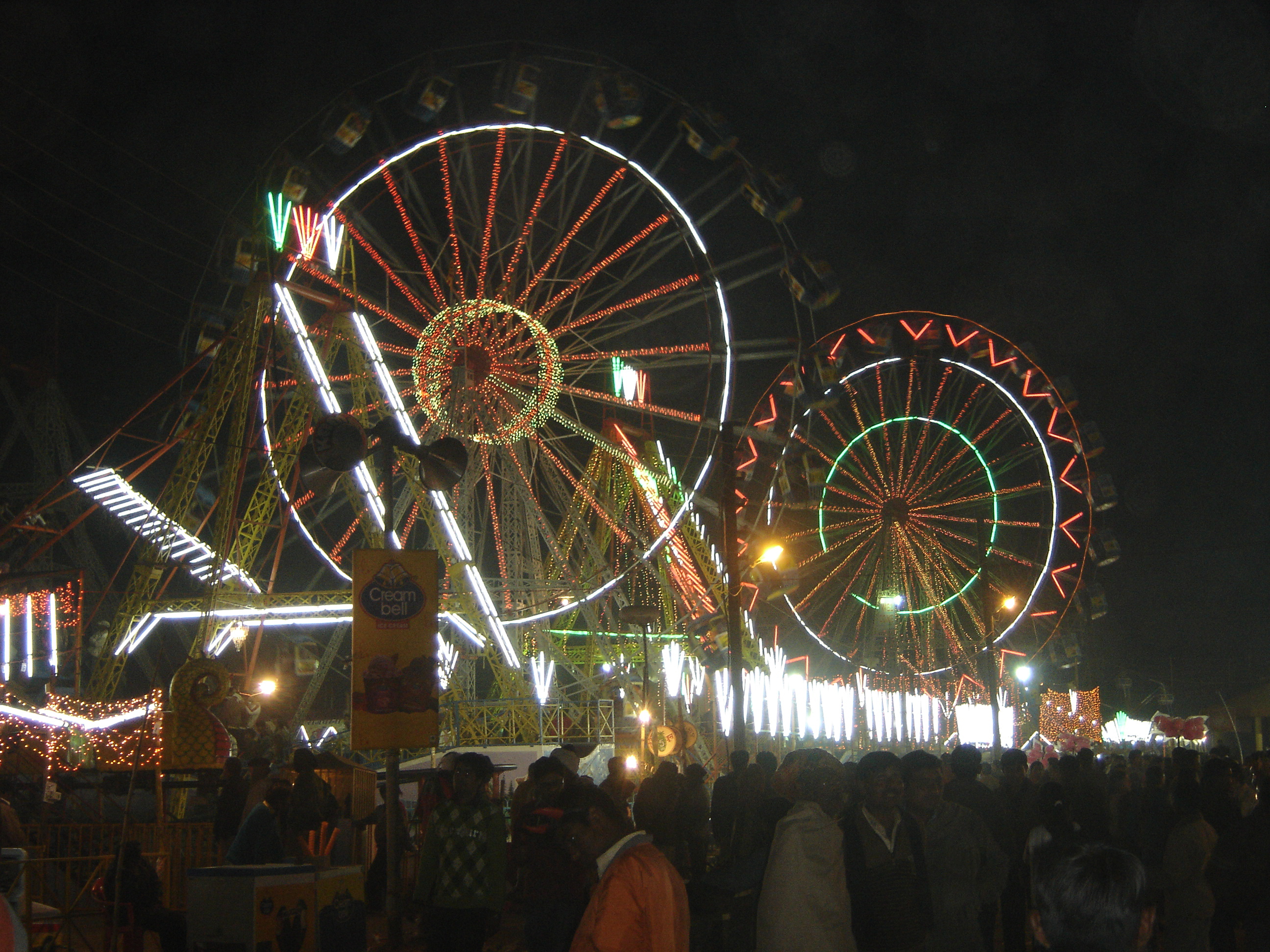

The Gwalior Trade Fair is the largest trade fair in India. It was started in 1905 by the King of Gwalior, Maharaj Madhav Rao Scindia.

Gwalior trade fair consists of large showrooms of several national and international brands such as Audi, Mercedes, BMW, Samsung, and LG along with food zones, amusement rides, shops of clothes, bags, electronics, mobiles, laptops, cars, bikes, buses, trucks etc.

== Location ==
Covering 104 acres (0.42 km^{2}) and divided into several 'blocks' and 'sectors', the Mela (Hindi for fair) Ground at Race Course Road is known as the Pragati Maidan of Madhya Pradesh, India. The Gwalior Trade Fair Authority, an autonomous body, is responsible for the administration of the Fair.

== Attractions ==
Major attractions of the fair include the "Haasya Kavi Sammelan" (the poet's gathering), the "Kavvali Dangals", the "Mushairas", Cultural Evenings, Music Nights, and several other activities integral to the Mela.

The cattle trade fair is an integral part of the Fair, with about 10,000 animals being sold or bought each year.

Shilp Bazaar is a beautiful attraction of Gwalior Trade Fair. In this bazaar, different types of handmade things are sold by people from all over India.

Many attractive and decorated rides, shops and circuses attract people in Gwalior Trade Fair.
