= Khamaria, Jabalpur =

Khamaria
- Census town
- Location in Madhya Pradesh, India Khamaria (India)
- Coordinates: 23°12′37″N 80°1′42″E
- Country: India
- State: Madhya Pradesh
- District: Jabalpur

Population (2001)
  - Total: 14,557

Languages
  - Official: Hindi
- Time zone: UTC+5:30 (IST)
- ISO 3166 code: IN-MP
- Vehicle registration: MP

Khamaria is a census town in Jabalpur District in the Indian state of Madhya Pradesh. The town is mainly a campus of the local Ordnance Factory Khamaria.

== Demographics ==
As of 2001 India census, Khamaria had a population of 14,557. Males constitute 53% of the population and females 47%. Khamaria has an average literacy rate of 82%, higher than the national average of 69.5%: male literacy is 87%, and female literacy is 76%. In Khamaria, 8% of the population is under six years of age.

== Events ==
The 1942 established Ordnance Factory, Khamaria, suffered a major setback when a fire broke out on Saturday, 25 March 2017, totally destroying factories No. 316 and 318, and injuring more than 20 people. As stated by Jabalpur collector Mahesh Chandra Chaudhary to PTI on phone, the first explosion took place at 6:24 pm, followed by massive fires and explosions, the worst incident since the past five years. The incident took place during the workers shift change, when the 125 mm anti-tank bombs were being dispatched.
