= Vehicle Factory Jabalpur =

Indian military vehicle manufacturer

- Type: Defence Vehicles Manufacturer
- Industry: Defence
- Founded: 1969; 57 years ago
- Key people: Ashok Gupta, IOFS (Chief General Manager)
- Products: Military vehicles
- Number of employees: 2,600
- Parent: Armoured Vehicles Nigam Limited (current); Ordnance Factories Board (1969-2021)

Vehicle Factory Jabalpur (Hindi: वाहन निर्माणी जबलपुर) is a military motor vehicle factory located in Jabalpur, Madhya Pradesh, India. It is a part of Armoured Vehicles Nigam Limited, which was previously a part of the Ordnance Factory Board, and is controlled by the Ministry of Defence, Government of India.

== History ==
The production of Shaktiman trucks (MAN 415 L1 AR), Jonga (Jabalpur Ordnance and Guncarriage Assembly) Light Utility Vehicles and the Vahan 1 ton (Nissan 4W73 Carrier), began at the Gun Carriage Factory Jabalpur, in 1959. Pandit Jawaharlal Nehru, the then Prime Minister of India, was present to witness rolling out of the first batch of vehicles at GCF. It was shifted to the present location in 1969. It started manufacturing Shaktiman trucks with license from MAN SE of Germany, along with Jonga and Vahan 1 ton under license from Nissan of Japan. All three of the above products have been retired and replaced by the new products.

In its 2014 report, the Comptroller and Auditor General of India (CAG) reported a 42% production shortfall in Mine Protected Vehicle Mark III at Vehicle Factory Jabalpur, valued at ₹158 crore, with no reasons recorded for the shortfall. In October 2014, the Central Bureau of Investigation registered a bribery case against a factory official and a private supplier over alleged irregularities in procurement contracts. In 2019, production of mine-protected vehicles was delayed due to shortages of essential components.

== Products ==
VFJ manufactures and assembles general staff vehicles, logistics vehicles, light armoured vehicles like bullet-proof vehicles, mine protected vehicles and specialist role vehicles such as rocket launchers, self-propelled howitzers, water bowsers, fuel tankers, field ambulances, tippers, battery command posts, generator sets, light recovery vehicles, field artillery tractors, kitchen containers etc. It also has some variants for civilian applications.

- Rocket launchers for Pinaka and Smerch with OFAJ
- 5/7.5 Ton Stallion Mk-IV BS-III
- 2.5 Ton LPTA 715 BS-III
- Water Bowser 2 KL on LPTA
- Water Bowser 5 KL on Stallion
- Kitchen Container on Stallion
- Field Ambulance on LPTA
- Light Recovery Vehicle (LRV)
- Field Artillery Tractor (FAT)
- Yuktirath – Light Armoured Recovery Vehicle
- Truck-mounted AK-630 CIWS with OFMK
- 5 KL Fuel Tanker on Stallion
- 2 KL Fuel Tanker on LPTA
- Battery Command Post (BCP)
- Mobile AC Generators
- Operation Theatre on wheels
- Mobile Decontamination Unit
- Tipper on Stallion
- Tipper on LPTA
- Aditya – India's first Mine Protected Vehicle
- Self-propelled Dhanush and Sharang guns and their tractors with GCF
- Matang
- Trishul
- Flyer ITV
- Caravan
- Drill Rig
- Humsafar Buses (Long & Medium)
- Fire fighting variants of Stallion and LPTA
- Bullet-proofing of 407, LPTA, Gypsy, Ambassador

== Gallery ==
Past products and their variants

Matang Truck for the Indian Army

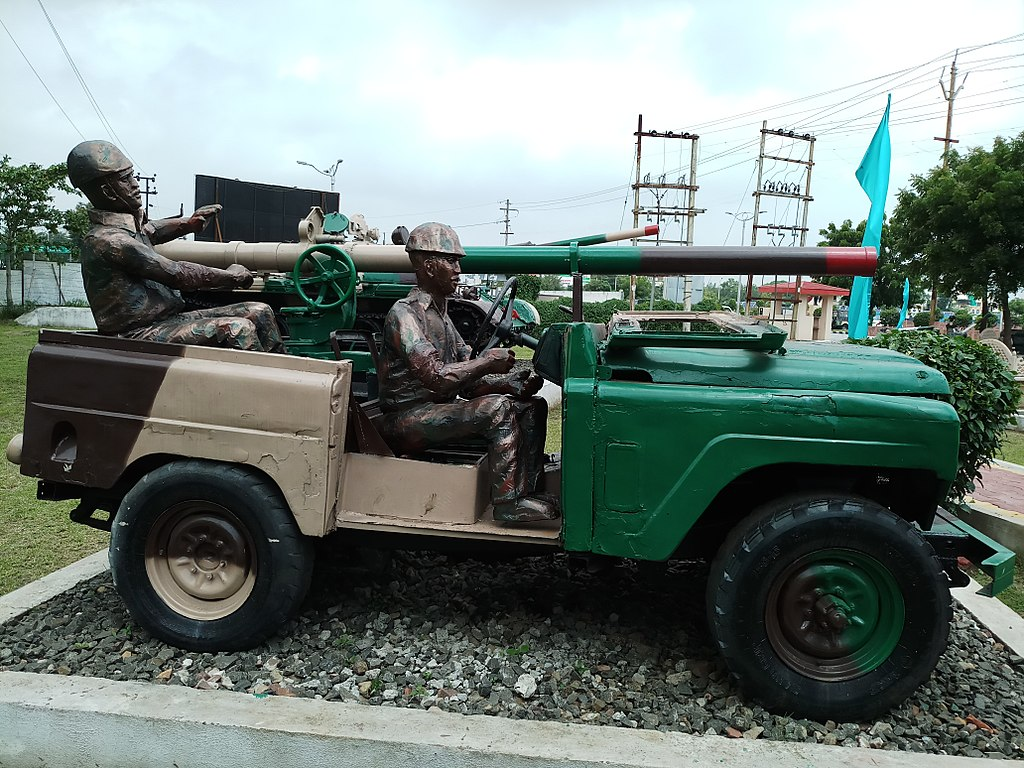
Jonga mounted with 105 mm RCL guns which destroyed most of the tanks during the 1965 and 1971 Indo-Pakistani wars

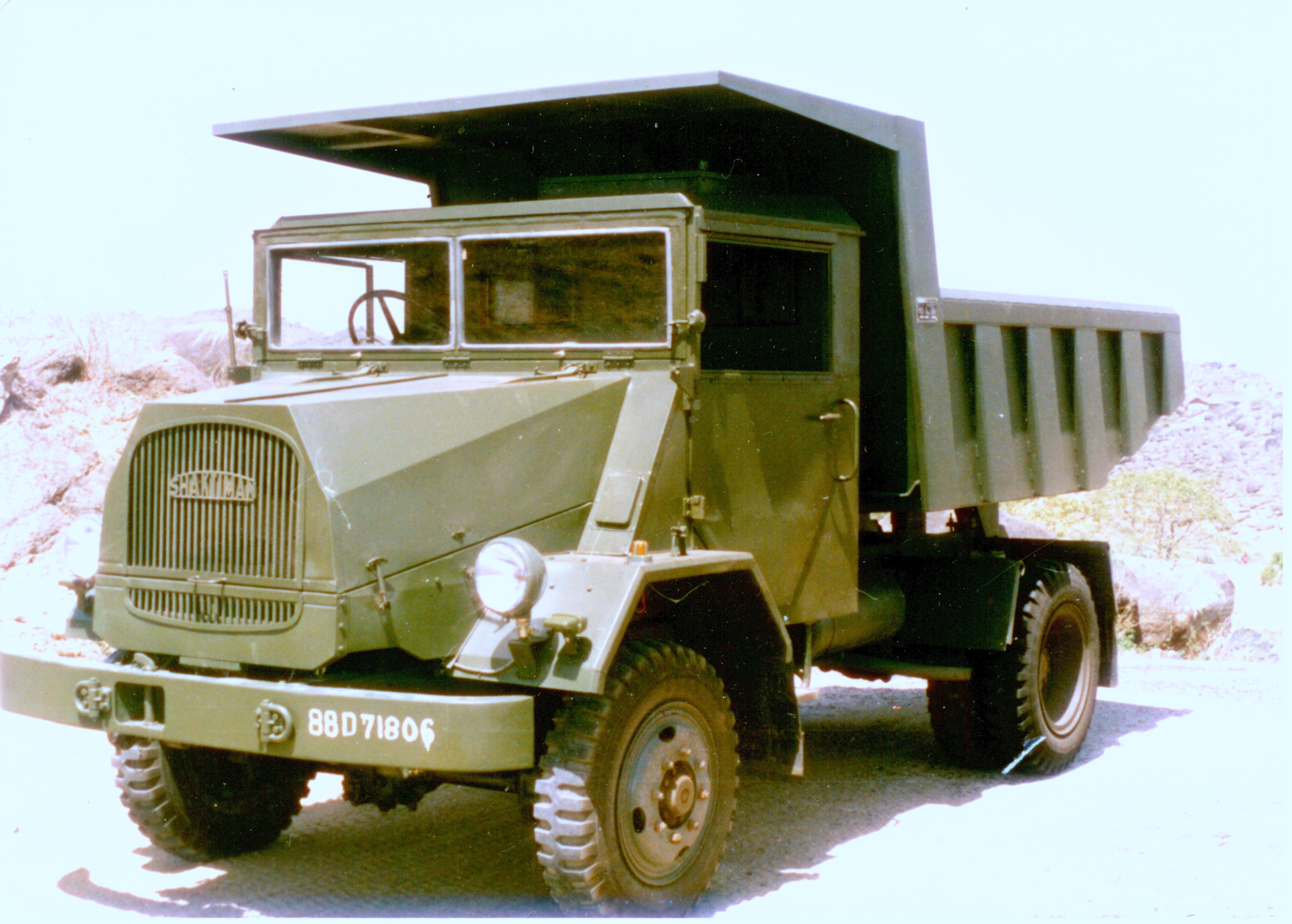
Jabalpur Vehicle Factory (VFJ )'s Tipper on Shaktiman; India's first 3-way tipper was built on the Shaktiman platform
Present products and their variants

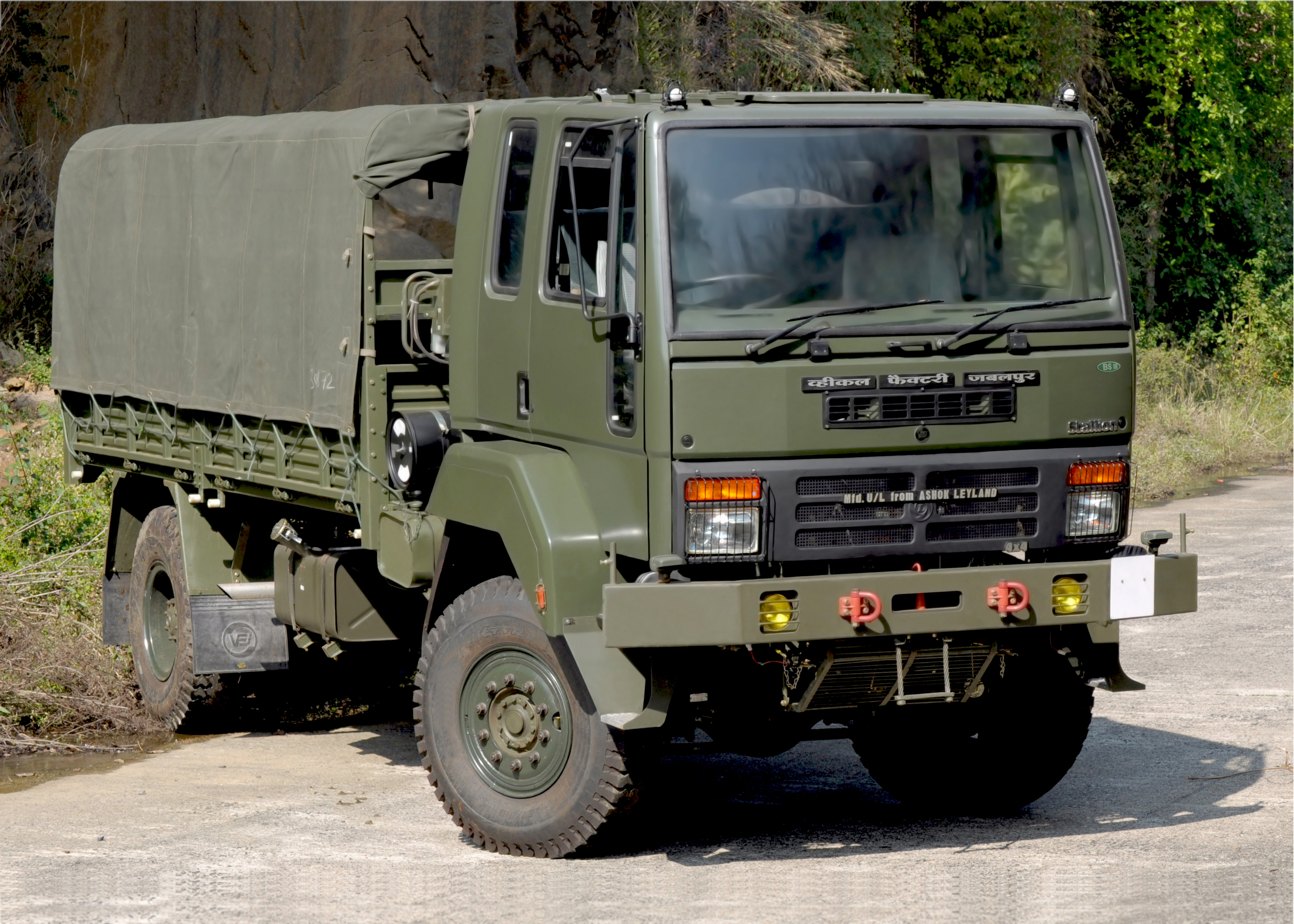
Stallion Mark I, now being replaced by Stallion Mark IV

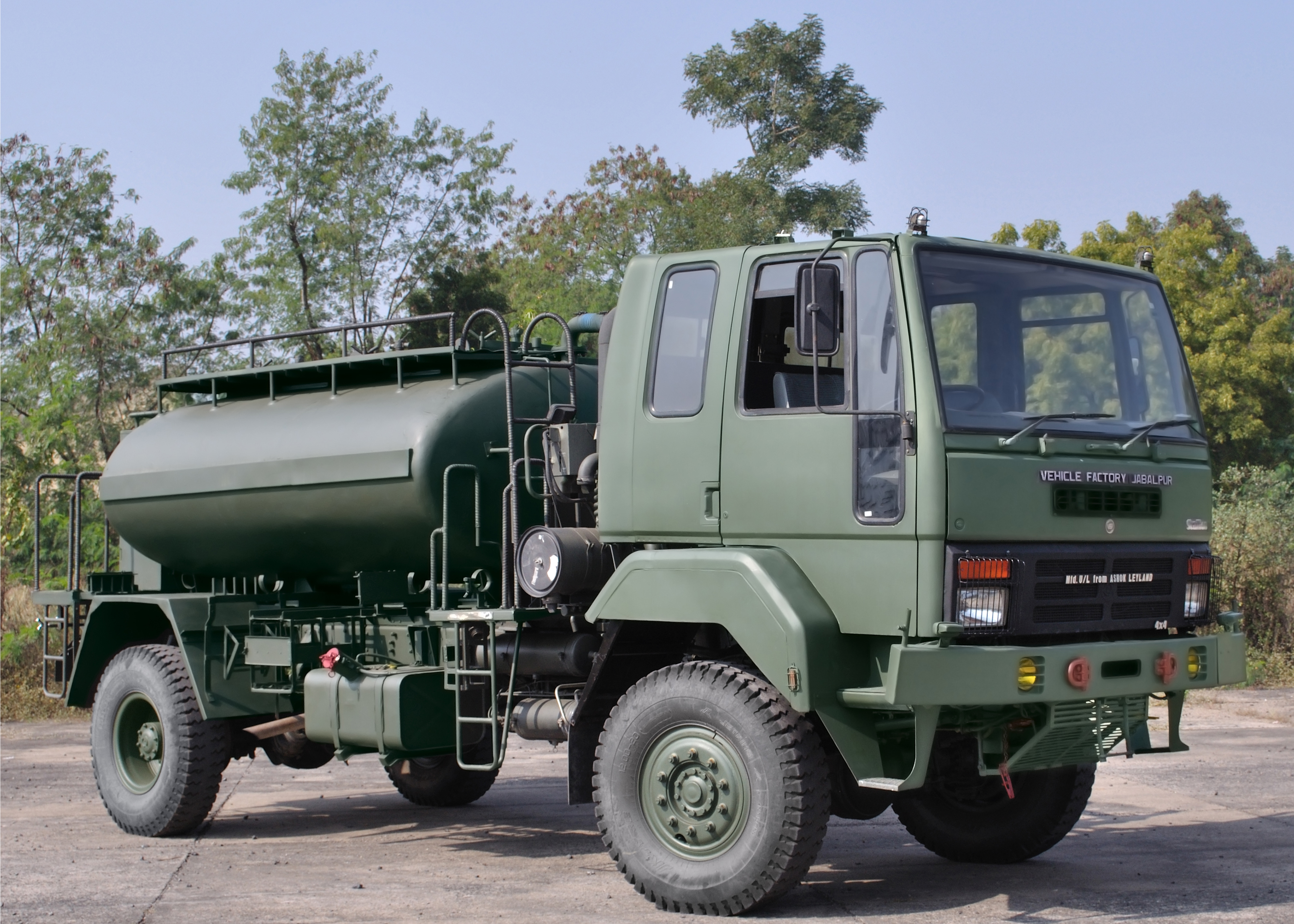
5000 Litres Water Bowser

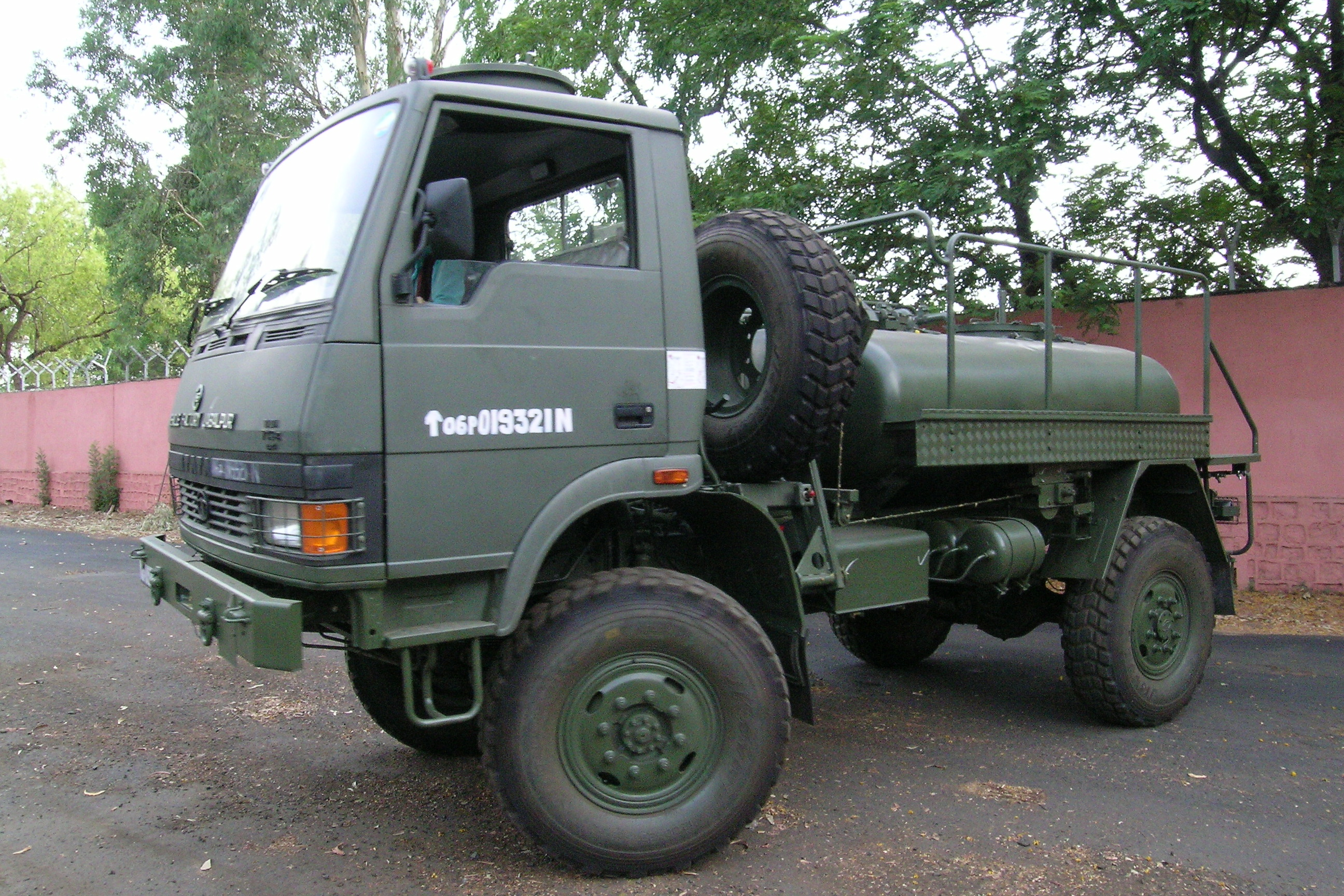
2000 Litres Water Bowser on LPTA

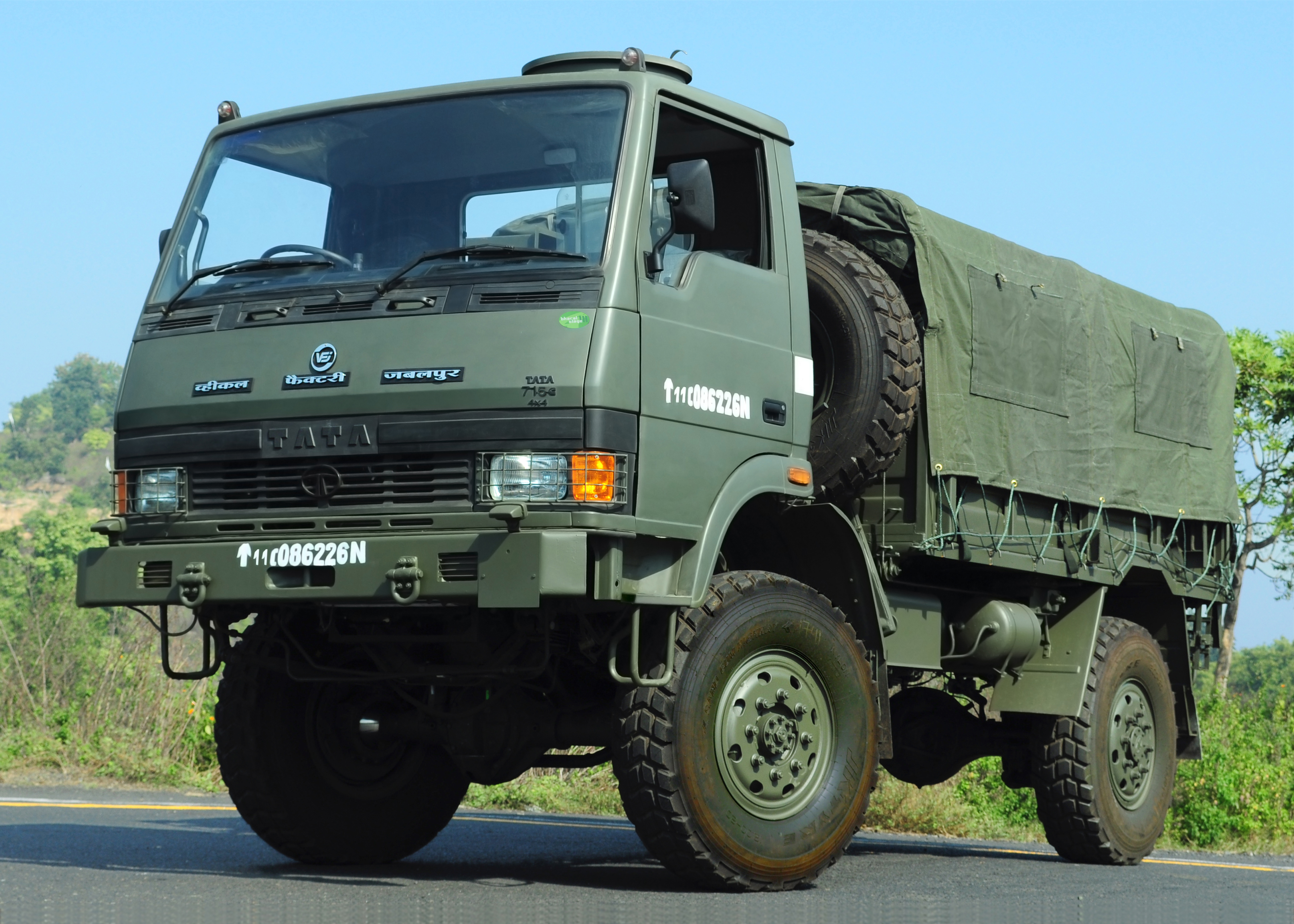
LPTA 715

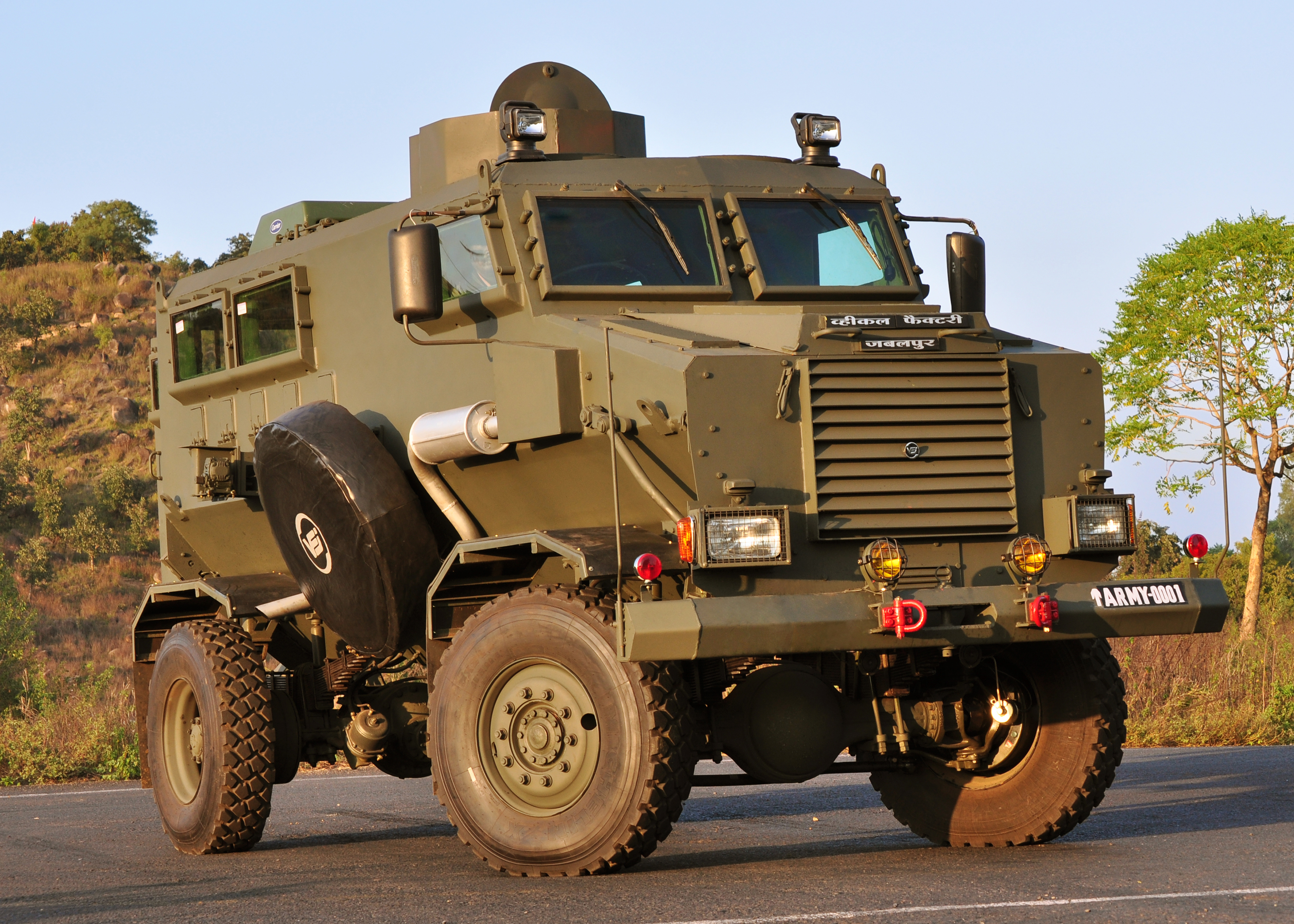
4X4 Mine Protected Vehicle, also in 6X6 configuration, with RCWS, recce and recovery variants

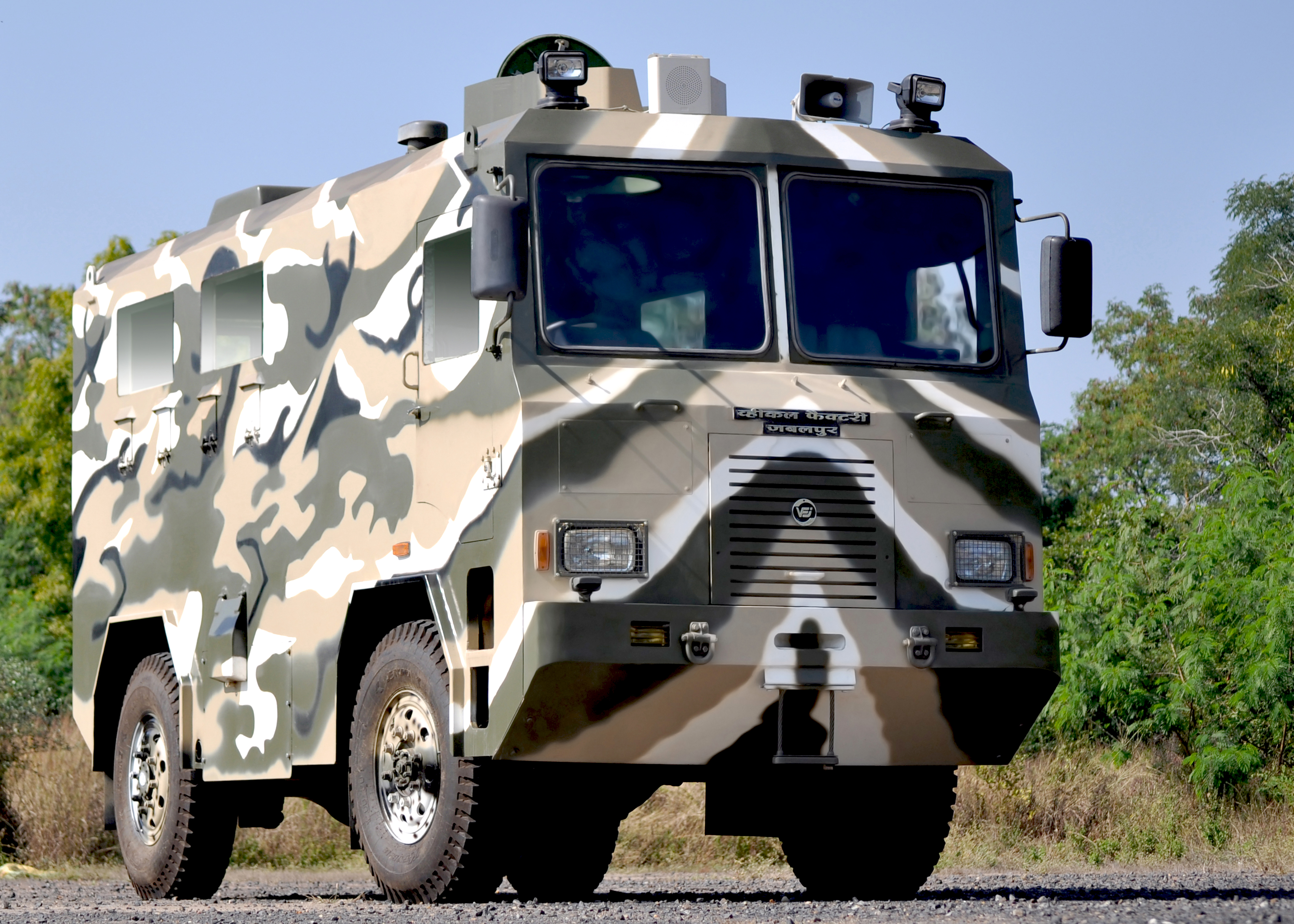
4X4 Bullet Proof Vehicle

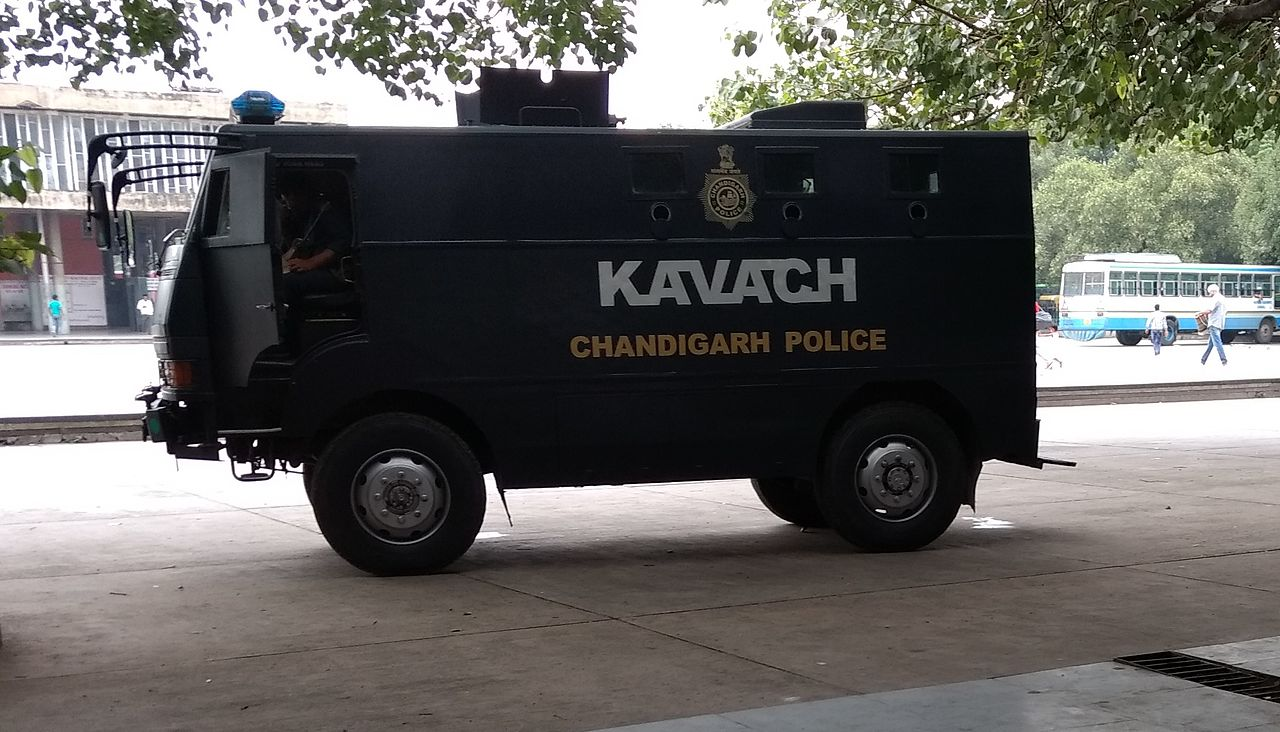
LPTA Armoured variant

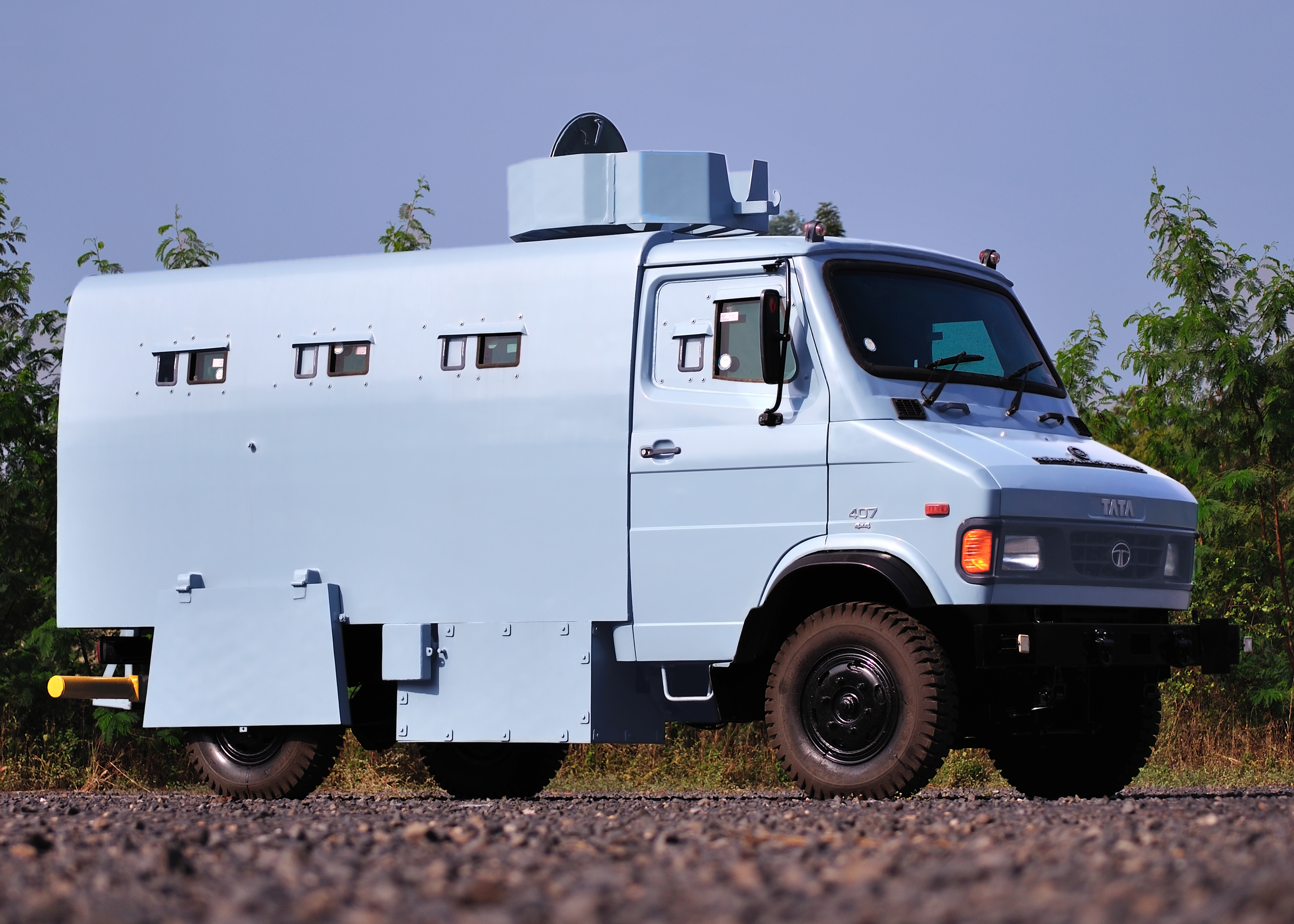
4X4 Riot Control Vehicle

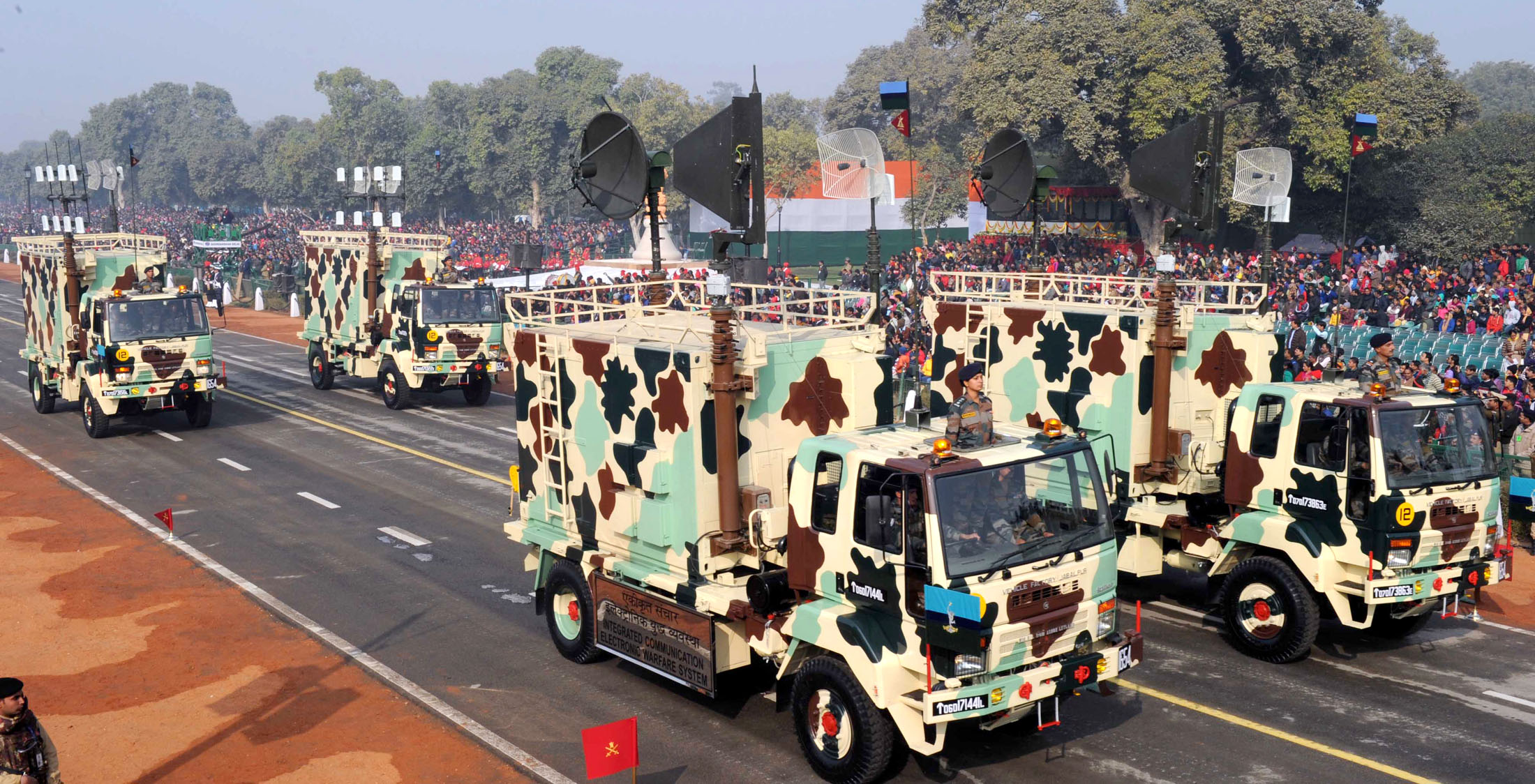
Integrated Communication Electronic Warfare System

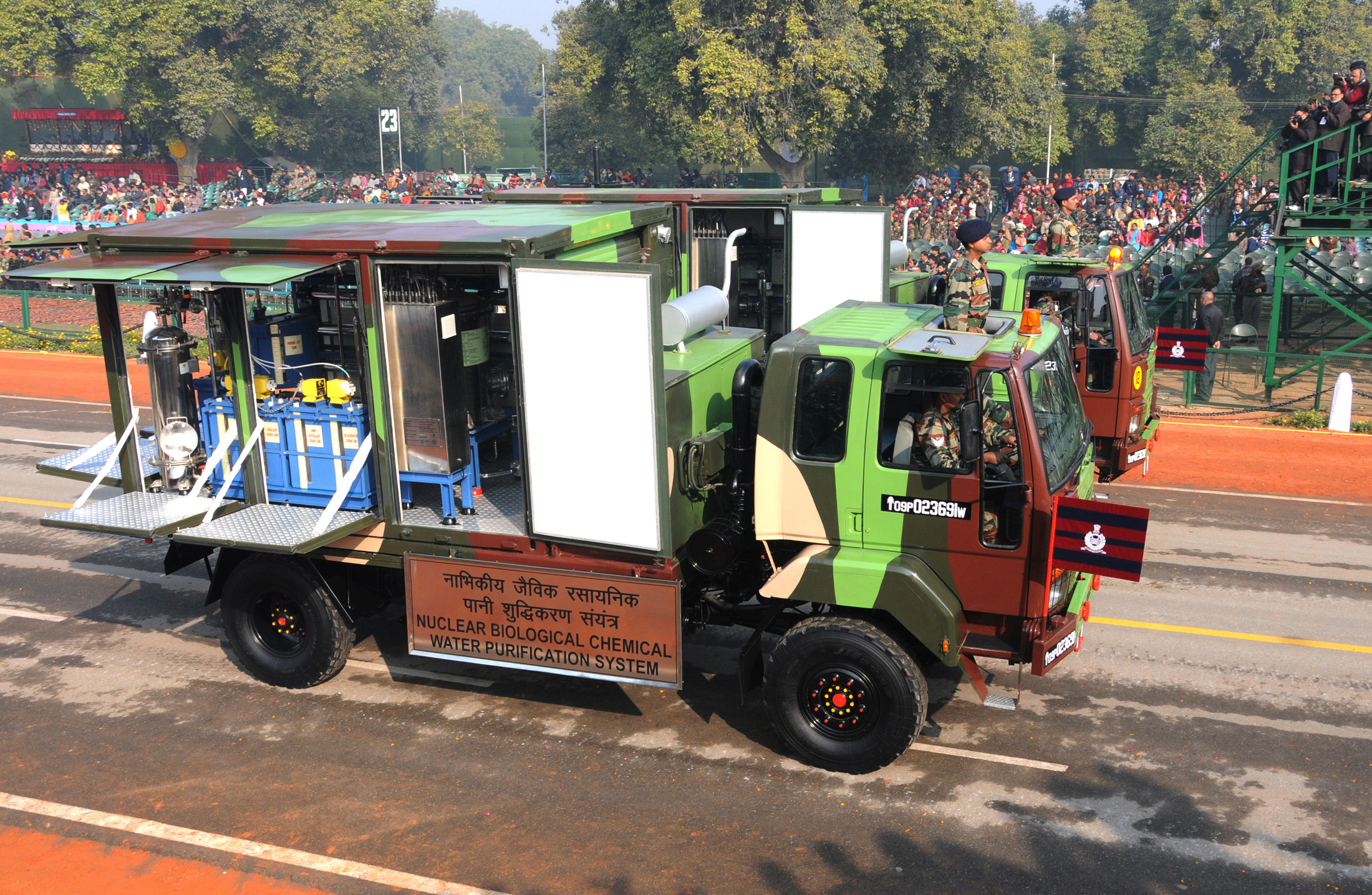
Nuclear Biological Chemical Water Purification System

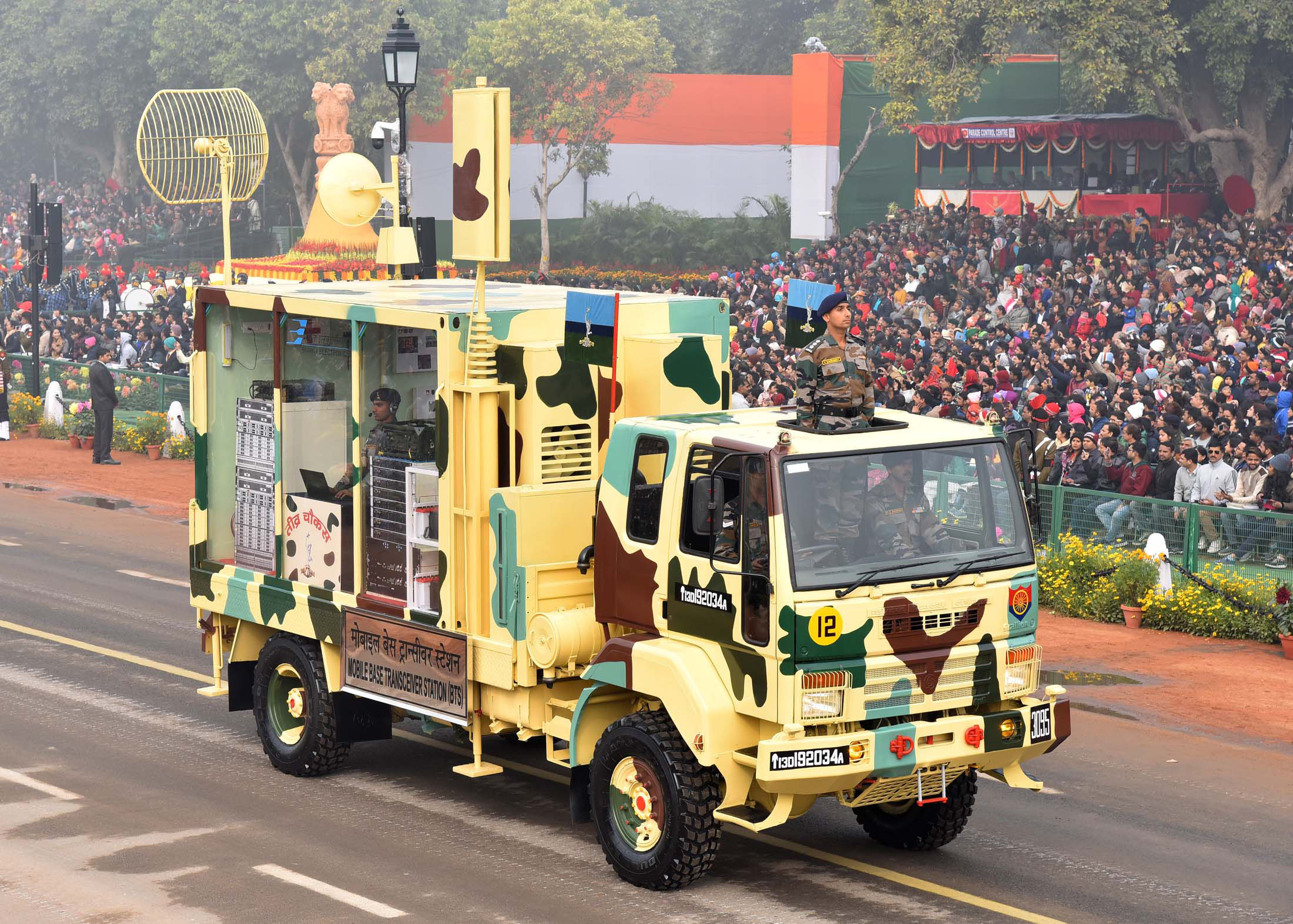
Mobile Base Transceiver Station

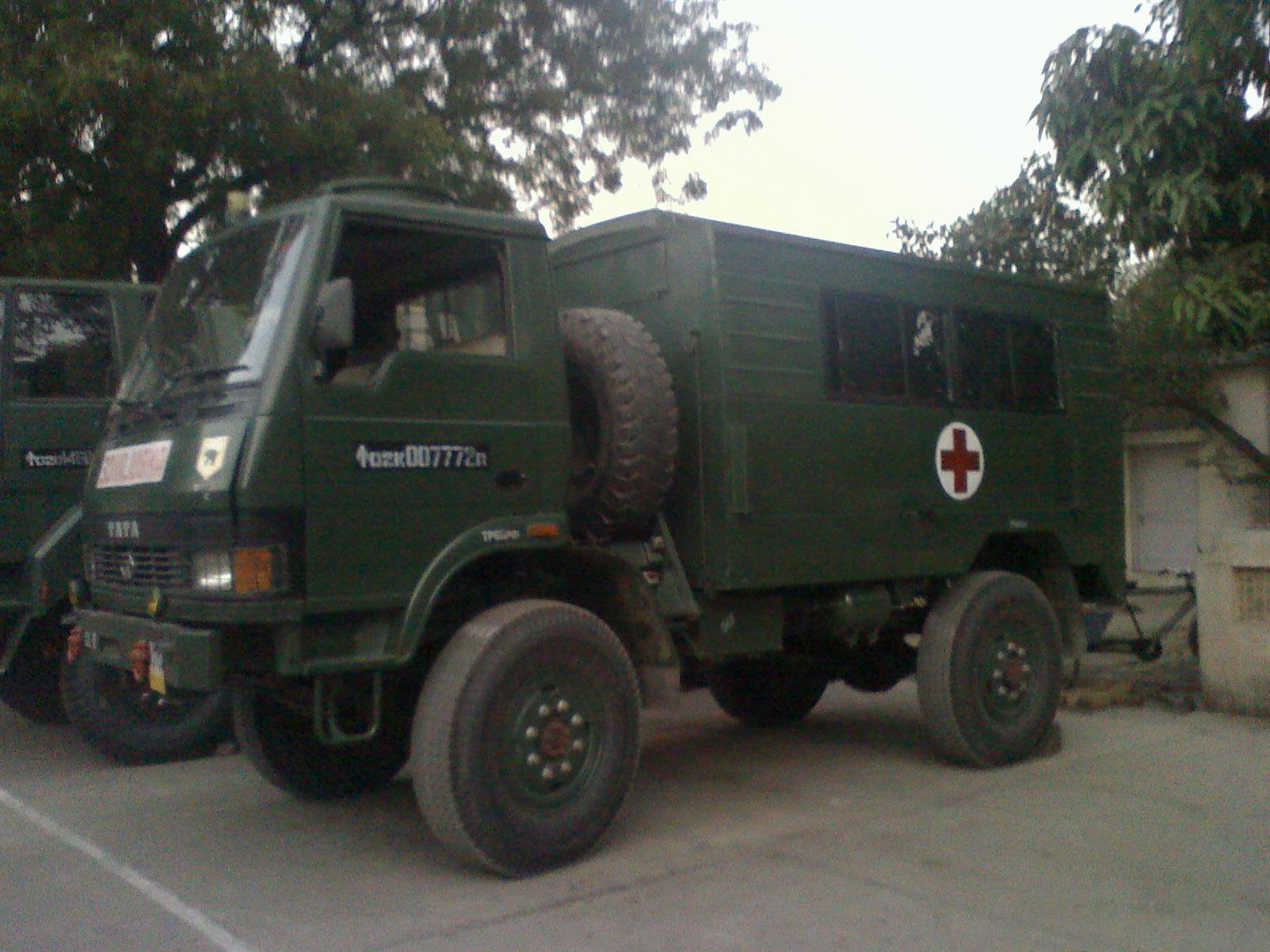
LPTA Field Ambulance
Future products and their variants

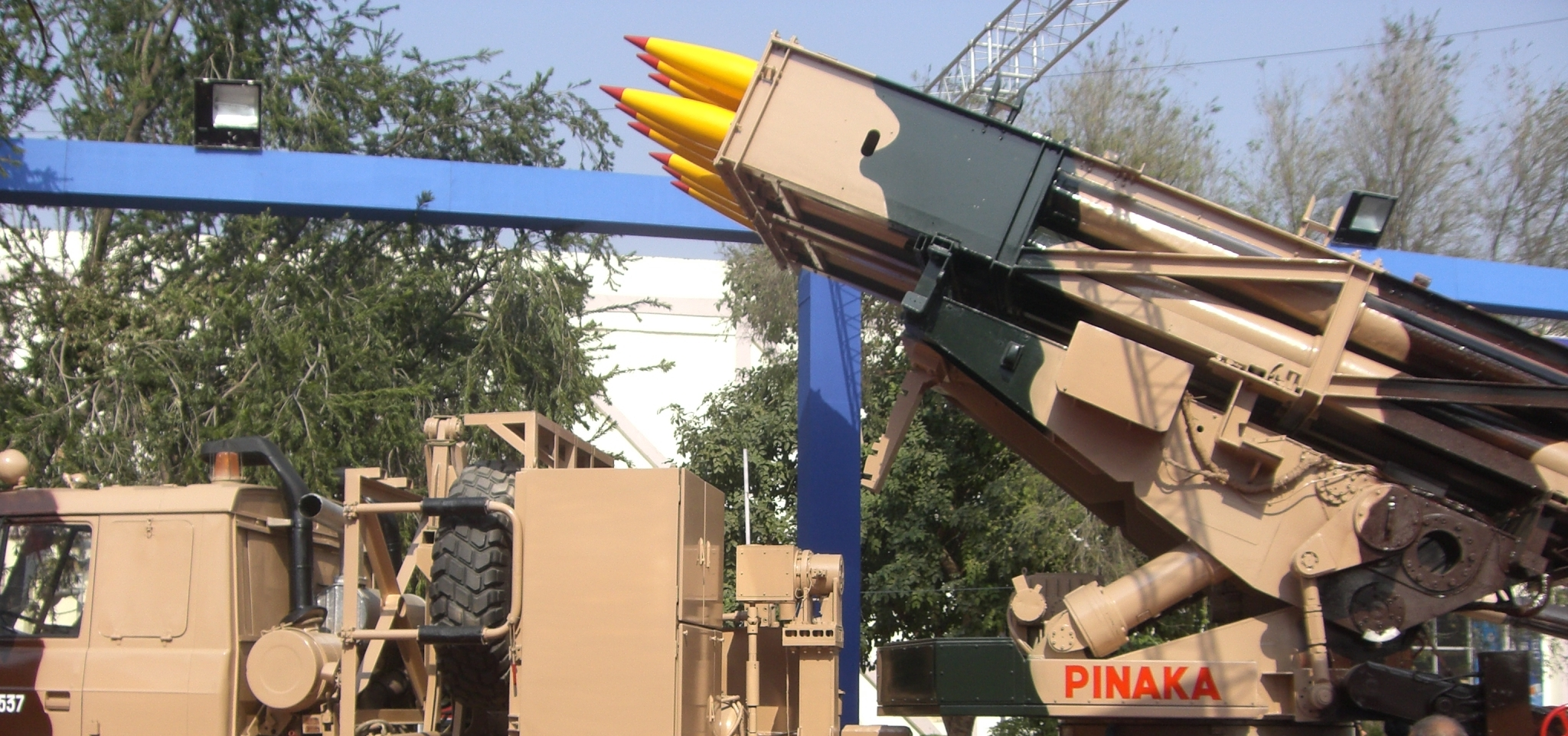
6X6 multi-barrel rocket launcher, soon to be produced

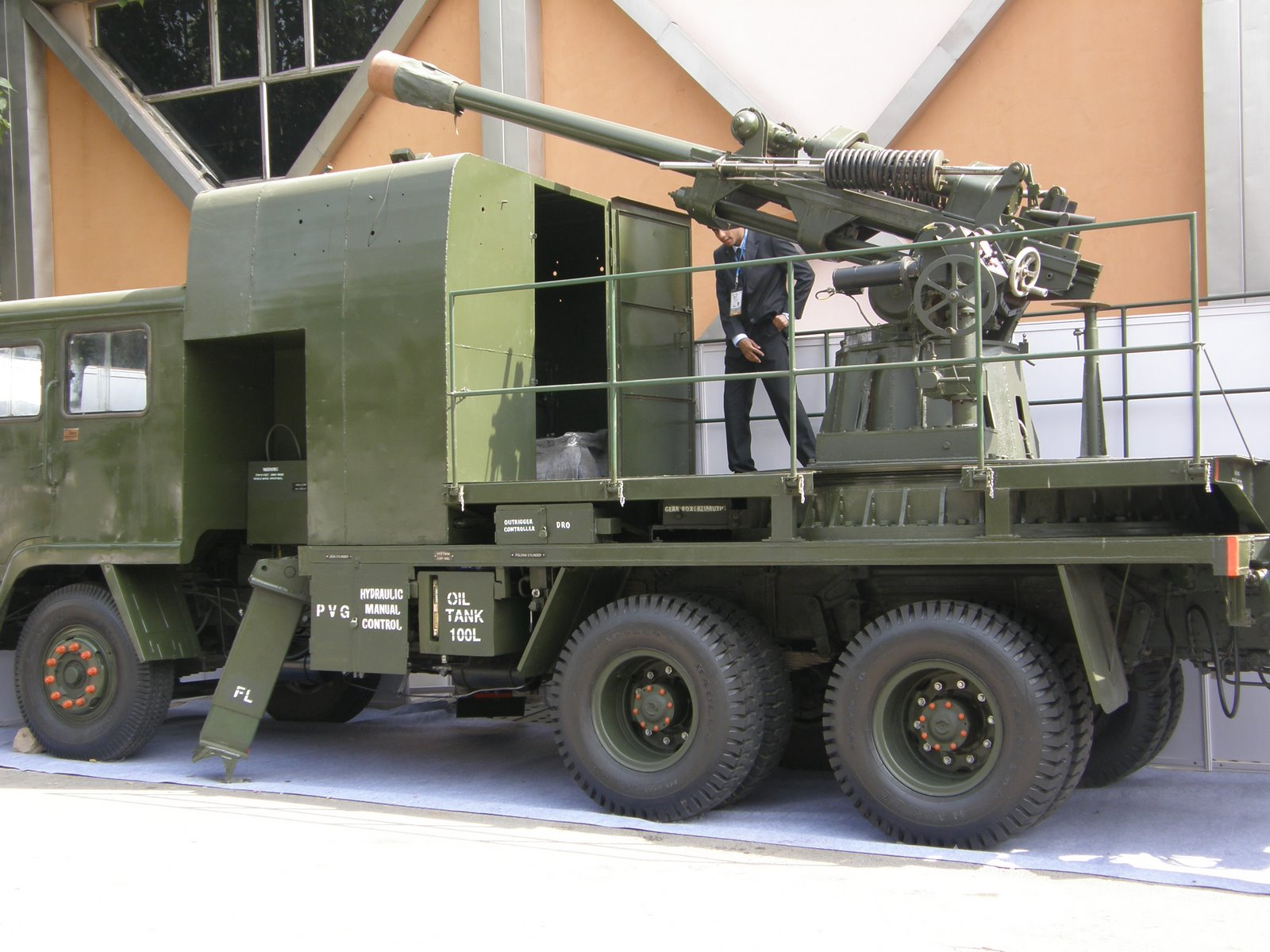
VFJ-GCF 105 mm Truck-mounted Self-Propelled Gun System, in 6X6 and 4X4 configurations

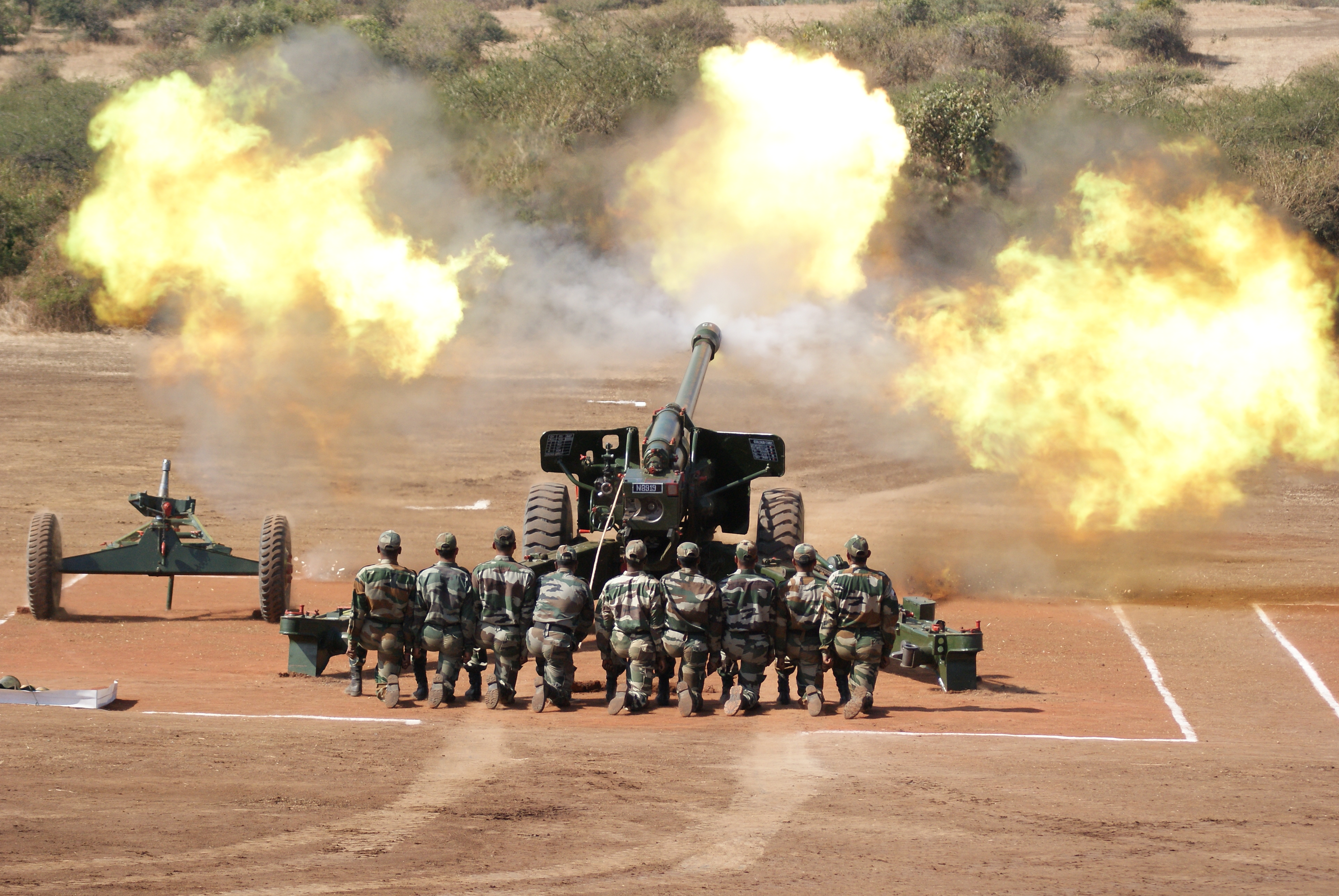
VFJ-GCF Sharang Towed Gun

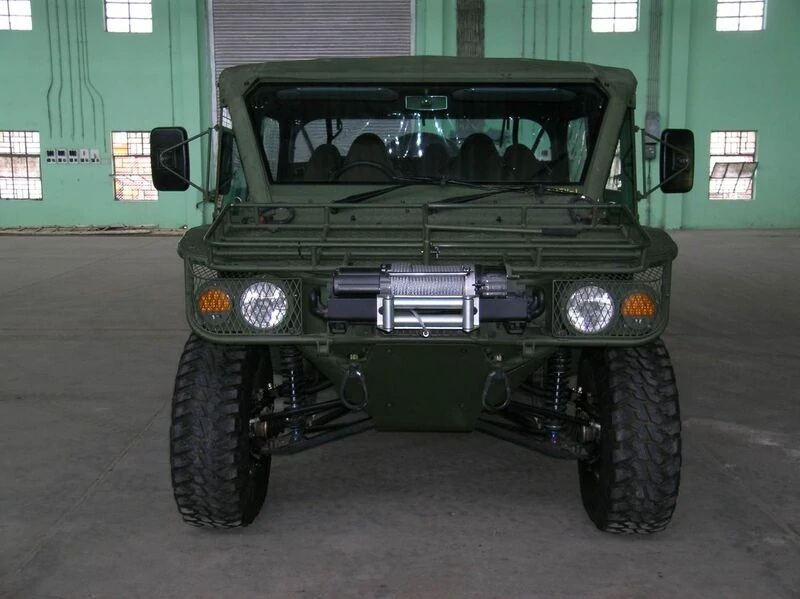
Flyer Internally-Transportable Vehicle (ITV), Light Strike Vehicle (LSV)

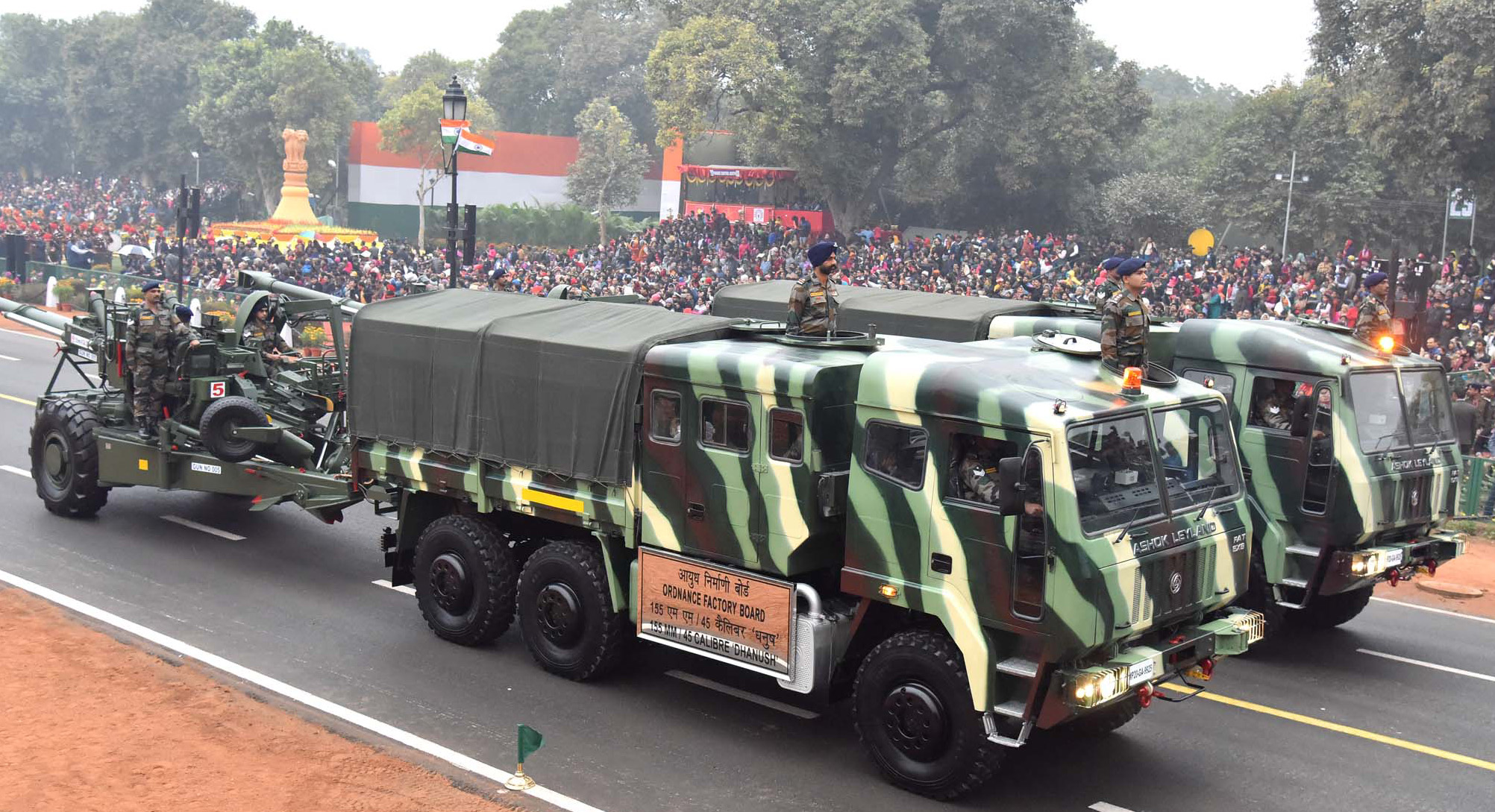
6X6 Dhanush Field artillery tractor

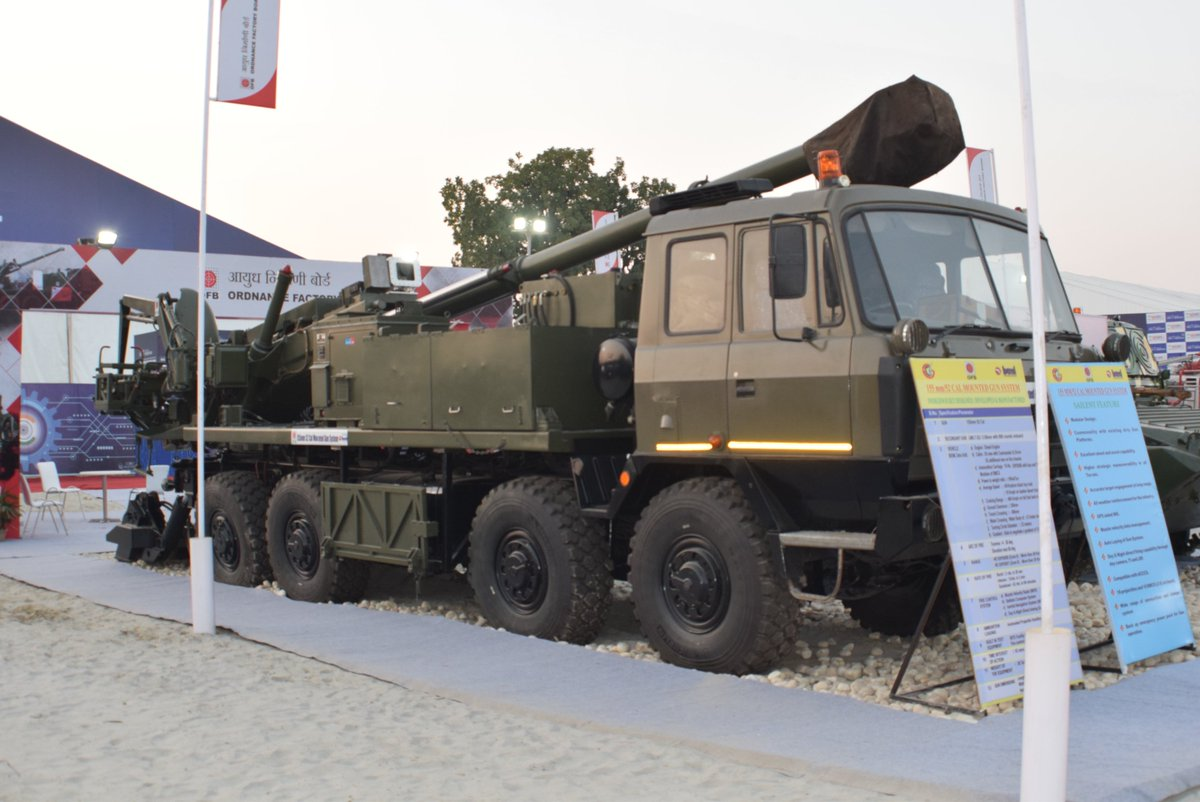
VFJ-GCF 8X8 155 mm Truck-mounted Self-Propelled Gun System

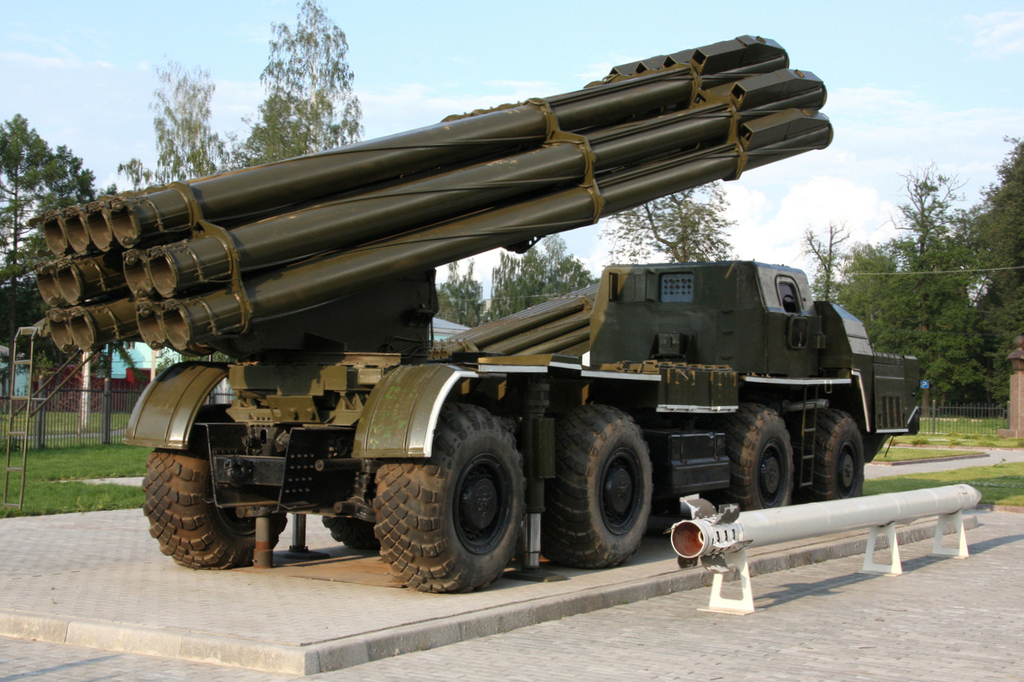
High Mobility Vehicle Launching Platform for Smerch Rockets, the same used for Pinaka

== Technology ==
VFJ has an R&D centre responsible for development of future vehicles and related technologies. It has tie-ups with Ashok Leyland and Tata Motors. Its research partner is Vehicle Research & Development Establishment of Defence Research and Development Organisation.

== Customers ==
Since VFJ produces defence vehicles, its primary customers are the Indian Armed Forces, Central Armed Police Forces, State Armed Police Forces, Paramilitary Forces of India and Special Forces of India, which have land-based operations. It also supplies vehicles to civilians, government and private organisations.
