= Khemka =

Khemka is a surname. Notable people with the surname include:

- Asha Khemka (born 1951), British educator
- Ashok Khemka (born 1965), Indian administrator
- Prashant Khemka (born 1971), businessman and investor
- Uday Khemka, Indian investor, entrepreneur, and philanthropist
