= Ashok Leyland =

Indian multinational automotive company

Ashok Leyland Limited
- Ashok Leyland 'flywheel' logo

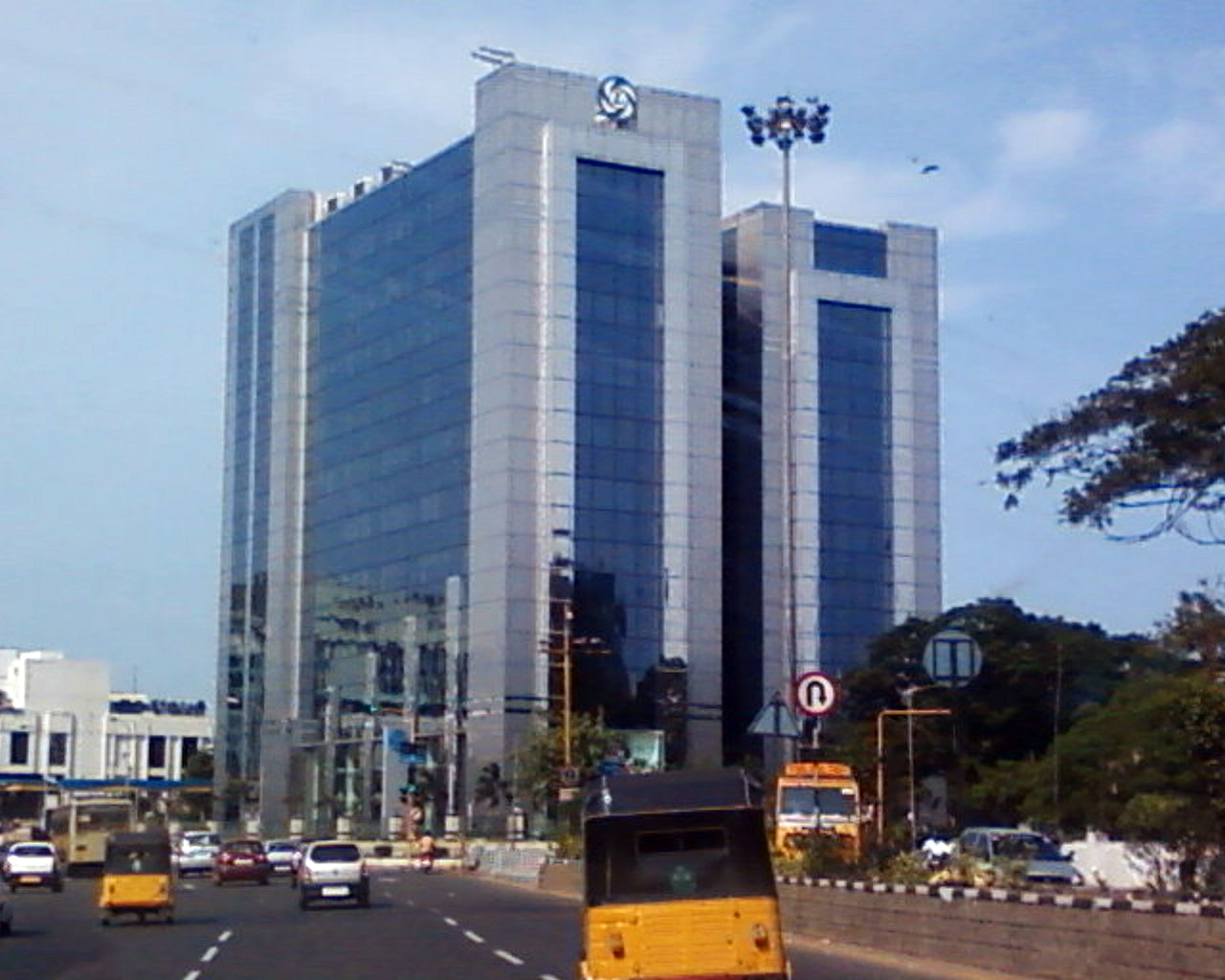
- Ashok Leyland's headquarters in Chennai, India
- Type: Public
- Traded as: BSE: 500477; NSE: ASHOKLEY
- ISIN: INE208A01029
- Industry: Automotive
- Founded: 7 September 1948; 78 years ago
- Headquarters: Chennai, Tamil Nadu, India
- Area served: Worldwide
- Key people: Dheeraj Hinduja (chairman)
- Products: Automobile; Commercial vehicles; Engines
- Services: Vehicle financing
- Revenue: ▲₹45,931 crore (US$4.8 billion) (2024)
- Operating income: ▲₹4,106 crore (US$430 million) (2024)
- Net income: ▲₹2,696 crore (US$280 million) (2024)
- Total assets: ▲₹67,660 crore (US$7.0 billion) (2024)
- Total equity: ▲₹11,814 crore (US$1.2 billion) (2024)
- Number of employees: 9,695 (2025)
- Parent: Hinduja Group (51.54%)
- Subsidiaries: Albonair GmbH; Global TVS Bus Body Builders Limited; Hinduja Leyland Finance; Hinduja Tech; Lanka Ashok Leyland Switch Mobility
- Website: www.ashokleyland.com

Ashok Leyland Limited is an Indian multinational automotive manufacturer headquartered in Chennai and owned by the Hinduja Group. Founded in 1948 as Ashok Motors, it was renamed Ashok Leyland in 1955 following a collaboration with British Leyland. Today it is the second-largest manufacturer of commercial vehicles in India (holding a 32.1% market share as of 2016), the third-largest bus manufacturer, and the tenth-largest manufacturer of lorries.

While its corporate office is located in Guindy, Chennai, the company operates manufacturing facilities in Hosur, Bhandara, Alwar, Vijayawada, Chennai (Ennore) and Pantnagar. Ashok Leyland also has overseas manufacturing units in Ras Al Khaimah, United Arab Emirates, and Leeds, United Kingdom. Additionally, it has a joint venture with the Alteams Group to manufacture high-press die-casting extruded aluminium components for the automotive and telecommunications sectors. The company also makes spare parts and engines for industrial and marine applications.

Ashok Leyland's products range from 1-tonne Gross Vehicle Weight (GVW) to 55-tonne Gross Trailer Weight (GTW). This includes trucks, buses ranging from 9 to 80 seats, vehicles for defence and special applications, and diesel engines for industrial, genset, and marine applications. In 2019, the company claimed to be ranked in the top 10 global commercial vehicle makers. It sold approximately 140,000 vehicles (M&HCV and LCV) in 2016. The company has passenger transportation options ranging from 10 seaters to 74 seaters (M&HCV = LCV). In the trucks segment, Ashok Leyland primarily concentrates on the 16 to 25-tonne range and has a presence in the 7.5 to 49 tonne range.

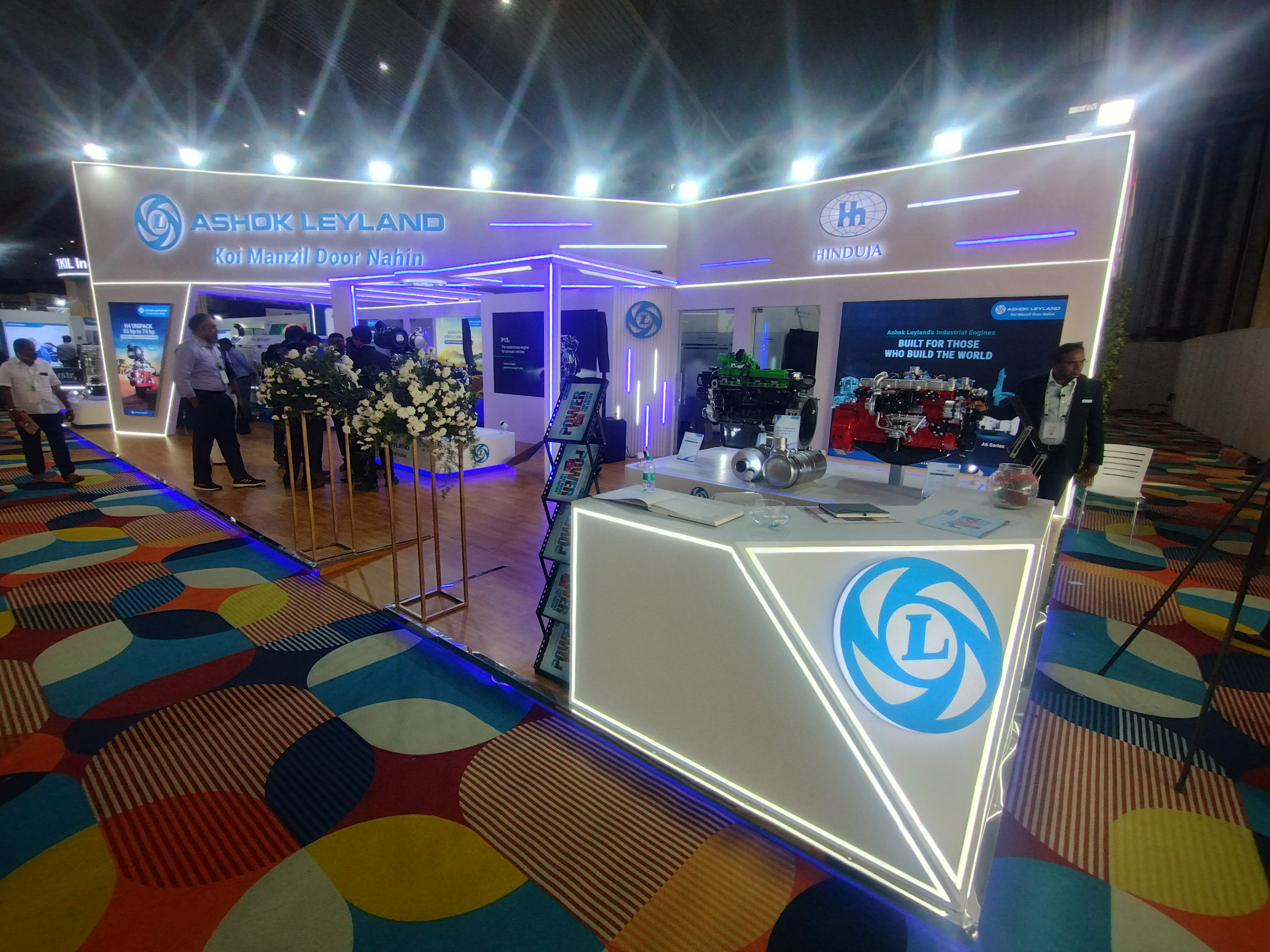
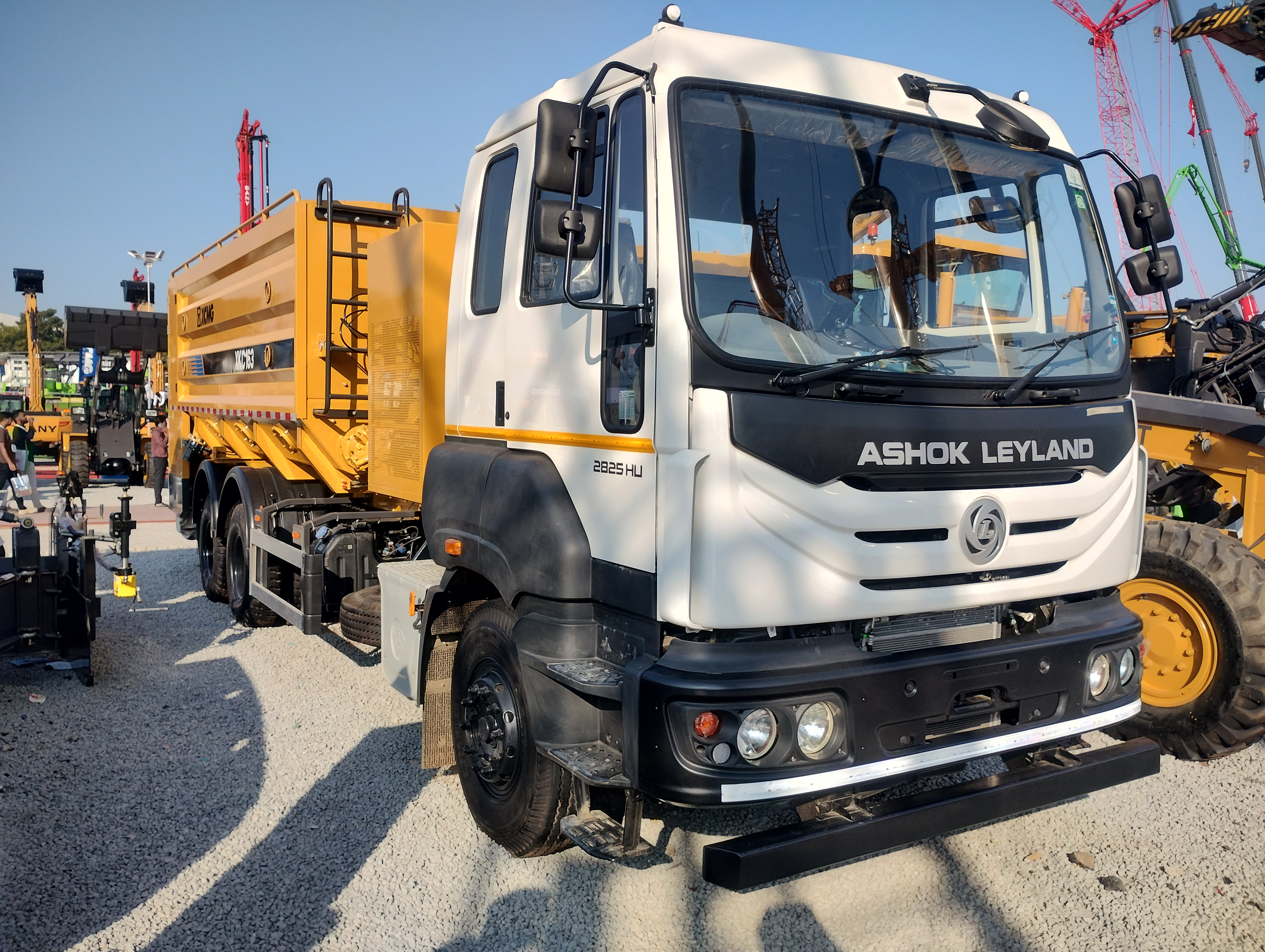
Ashok Leyland at EXCON 2025, BIEC

== History ==
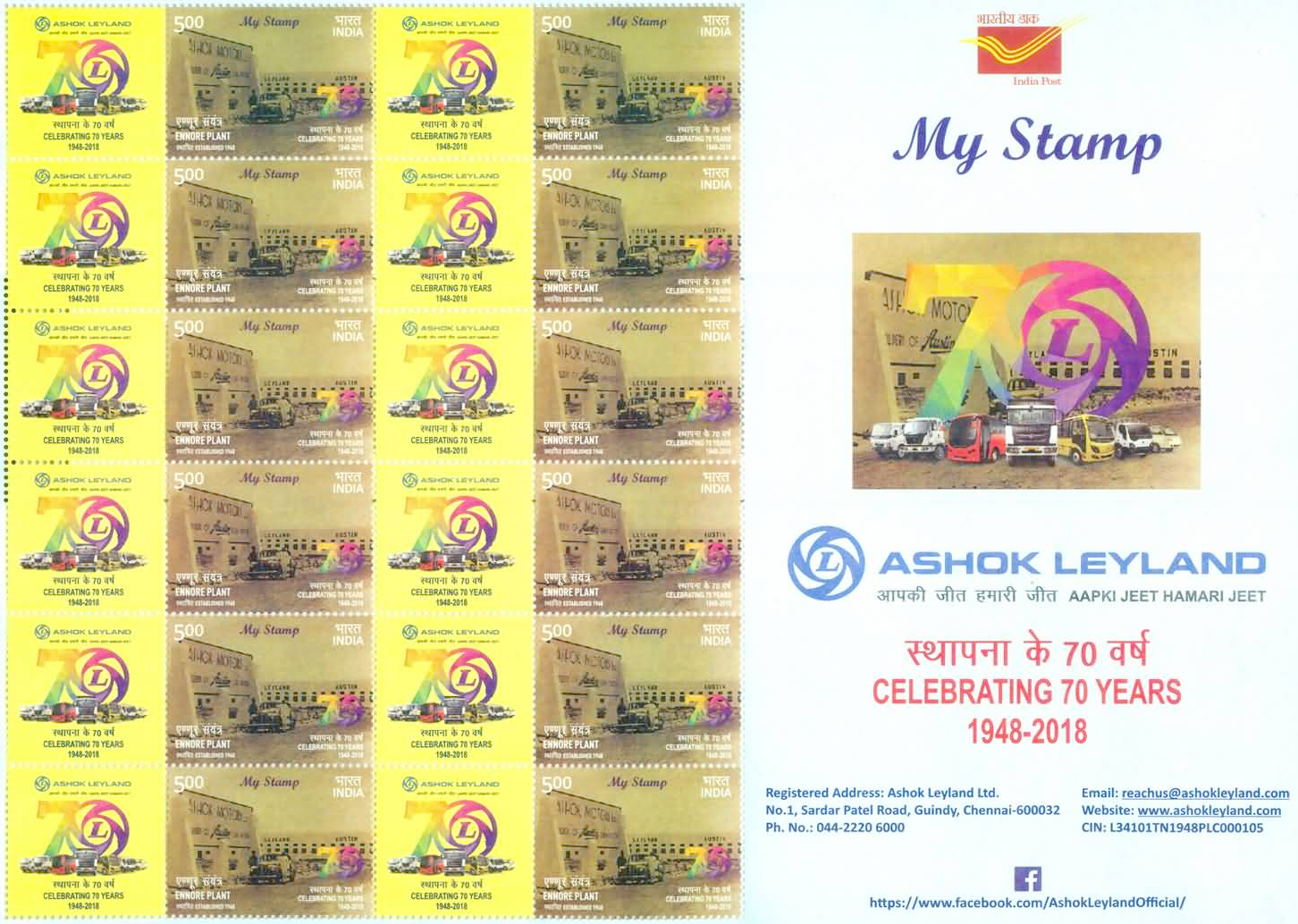
A 2018 stamp sheet of India dedicated to the 70th anniversary of Ashok Leyland

=== Ashok Motors ===
Ashok Motors was founded in 1948 by Raghunandan Saran, an Indian independence campaigner from Punjab. By the end of the Indian Independence Movement, he was persuaded by India's first Prime Minister Jawaharlal Nehru to invest in a modern industrial venture. Ashok Motors was incorporated in 1948 as a company to assemble and manufacture Austin cars from England, and the company was named after the founder's only son, Ashok Saran. The company had its headquarters in Chennai, with the manufacturing plant also in Chennai. The company was engaged in the assembly and distribution of Austin A40 passenger cars in India.

In year 1954 Indian government gave approvals to Ashok Motors to manufacturer Leyland Comet trucks the generation range of cabover trucks from Leyland and they also received approvals to manufacture Tiger Cub lightweight bus also by Leyland. These were the first models of British Leyland manufactured in india.

The collaboration ended in 1975 but the holding of British Leyland, which was then a major British vehicle conglomerate due to several mergers, agreed to assist in technology, which continued until the 1980s. After 1975, changes in management structures saw the company launch various vehicles in the Indian market, with many of these models continuing to this day with various upgrades.

=== Under Iveco and Hinduja partnership ===
In 1987, the overseas holding by Land Rover Leyland International Holdings Limited (LRLIH) was taken over by a joint venture between the Hinduja Group, the Non-Resident Indian transnational group and Iveco, part of the Fiat Group.

=== Hinduja Group ===
In 2007, the Hinduja Group bought out Iveco's indirect stake in Ashok Leyland. The promoter shareholding now stands at 51%. Today the company is the flagship of the Hinduja Group, a British-based and Indian originated trans-national conglomerate.

Ashok Leyland launched India's first electric bus and Euro 6 compliant truck in 2016.

In June 2020, Ashok Leyland launched its new range of modular trucks, AVTR.

In September 2020, Ashok Leyland launched the Bada Dost based on its indigenously developed LCV platform called Phoenix.

In 2024, Ashok Leyland entered into a Memorandum of Understanding (MoU) with the Tamil Nadu government for a Rs 1,200 crore investment.

On 22 July 2024, Ashok Leyland unveiled its first 15-metre, multi-axle bus chassis, the Ashok Leyland Garud, at the M&HCV Expo held at BIEC, Bengaluru.

Ashok Leyland will operate a plant for the manufacture of electric commercial vehicles in Uttar Pradesh. The plant will produce 2,500 vehicles a year, initially, and will gradually increase to 5,000 per year in the next decade. This facility will mainly produce electric buses. The plant will be launched in 2025.

== Partnerships ==
=== Rosoboronexport & ELCOM ===
Ashok Leyland Defence Systems (ALDS), Russia's Rosoboronexport and ELCOM Group have signed a cooperation agreement in defence business to provide tracked vehicles to the Indian Armed Forces. The agreement was signed on the side lines of the 2017 International Military Technical Forum Army held at Kubinka, near Moscow, on 25 August 2017.

=== IIT Madras ===
Ashok Leyland and Indian Institute of Technology Madras (IIT Madras) signed a memorandum of understanding, on 19 August 2017, for Ashok Leyland to sponsor the Centre of Battery Engineering (CoBE) at IIT Madras. As part of the agreement, Ashok Leyland partnered with IIT Madras to carry out research and development (R&D) activities for strengthening battery engineering and related sub-parts, especially for electric vehicles.

=== Sun Mobility ===
On 18 July 2017 Ashok Leyland announced the formation of an alliance with SUN Mobility, The global partnership aims to develop electric vehicles.

=== CVRDE partnership ===
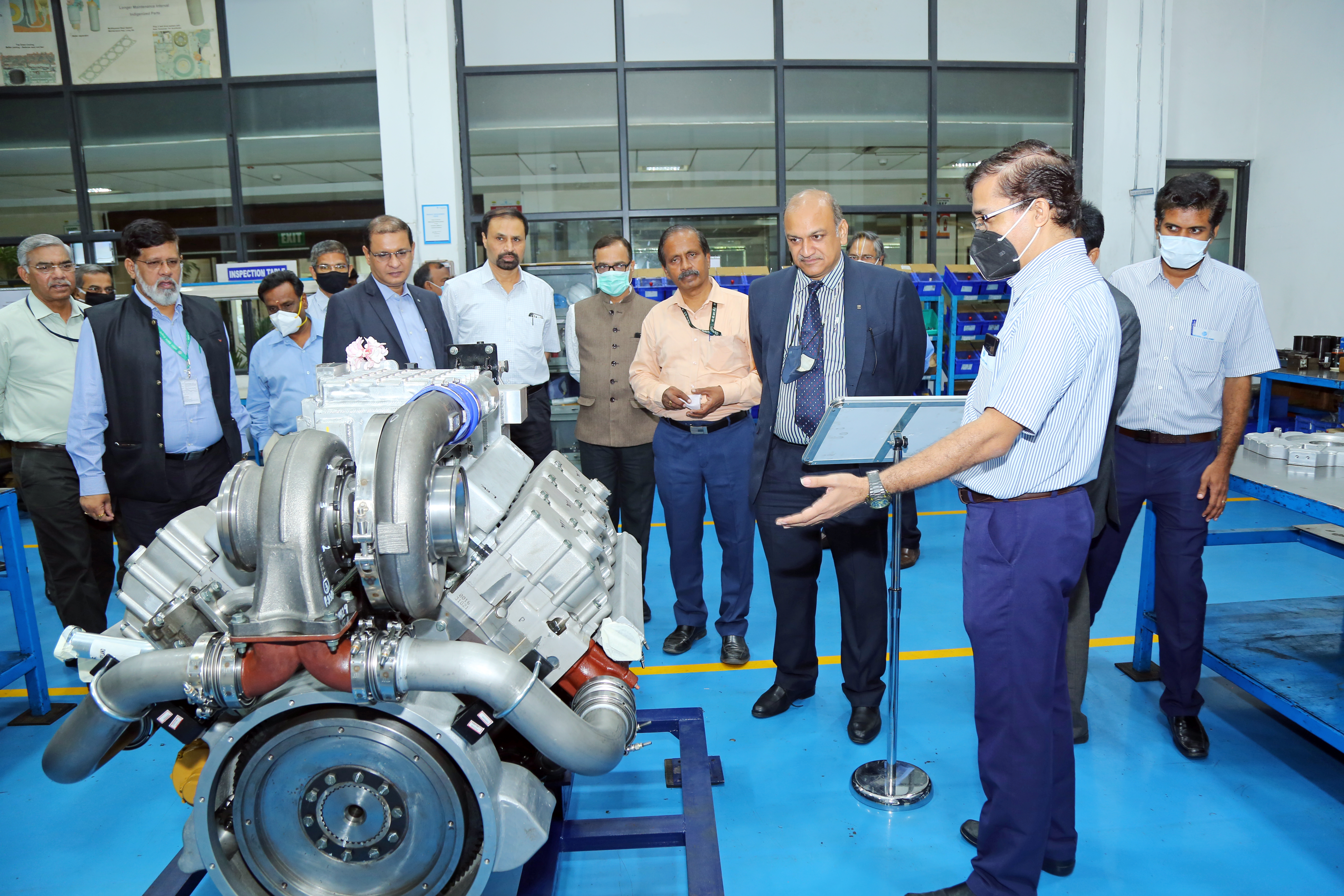
CVRDE 600-hp engine.

As reported in December 2021, Ashok Leyland has partnered with Combat Vehicles Research and Development Establishment (CVRDE) under the DRDO to design, develop and produce a 600-hp indigenous engine for the DRDO WhAP. As per the reports the prototype engine has been manufactured and will undergo rigorous testing in the lab and will be qualified for application in armoured fighting vehicles (AFV). Series production is scheduled to begin after operational start-up. The testing was inaugurated in the Engine Development Centre, Ashok Leyland, Vellivoyalchavadi, near Chennai.

=== Iveco partnership ===
In the late 1980s, Iveco investment and partnership resulted in Ashok Leyland launching the 'Cargo' range of trucks based on European Ford Cargo trucks. The Cargo entered production in 1994, at Ashok Leyland's new plant in Hosur. These vehicles used Iveco engines and for the first time had factory-fitted cabs. Though the Cargo trucks are no longer in production and the use of Iveco engine was discontinued, the cab continues to be used on the Ecomet range of trucks as well as for several of Ashok Leyland's military vehicles.

The Cargo was originally introduced in 7 and 9 long tons (7,100 and 9,100 kg) versions; later, heavier-duty models from 15 to 26 long tons (15,200 to 26,400 kg) were progressively introduced.

=== ETG Group ===
On 26 May 2022, Ashok Leyland has announced partnership with ETG Group to strengthen its partnership in Africa. As part of the tie-up, ETG Logistics (ETGL) will operate dealerships for Ashok Leyland in six key southern African countries.

=== South Indian Bank ===
Ashok Leyland and South Indian Bank signed a memorandum of understanding, on 18 April 2024, for providing competitive finance options to the dealers of the truck and bus maker. As part of the agreement, South Indian Bank will offer appropriate inventory financing solutions to Ashok Leyland's network of dealers.

== Products ==
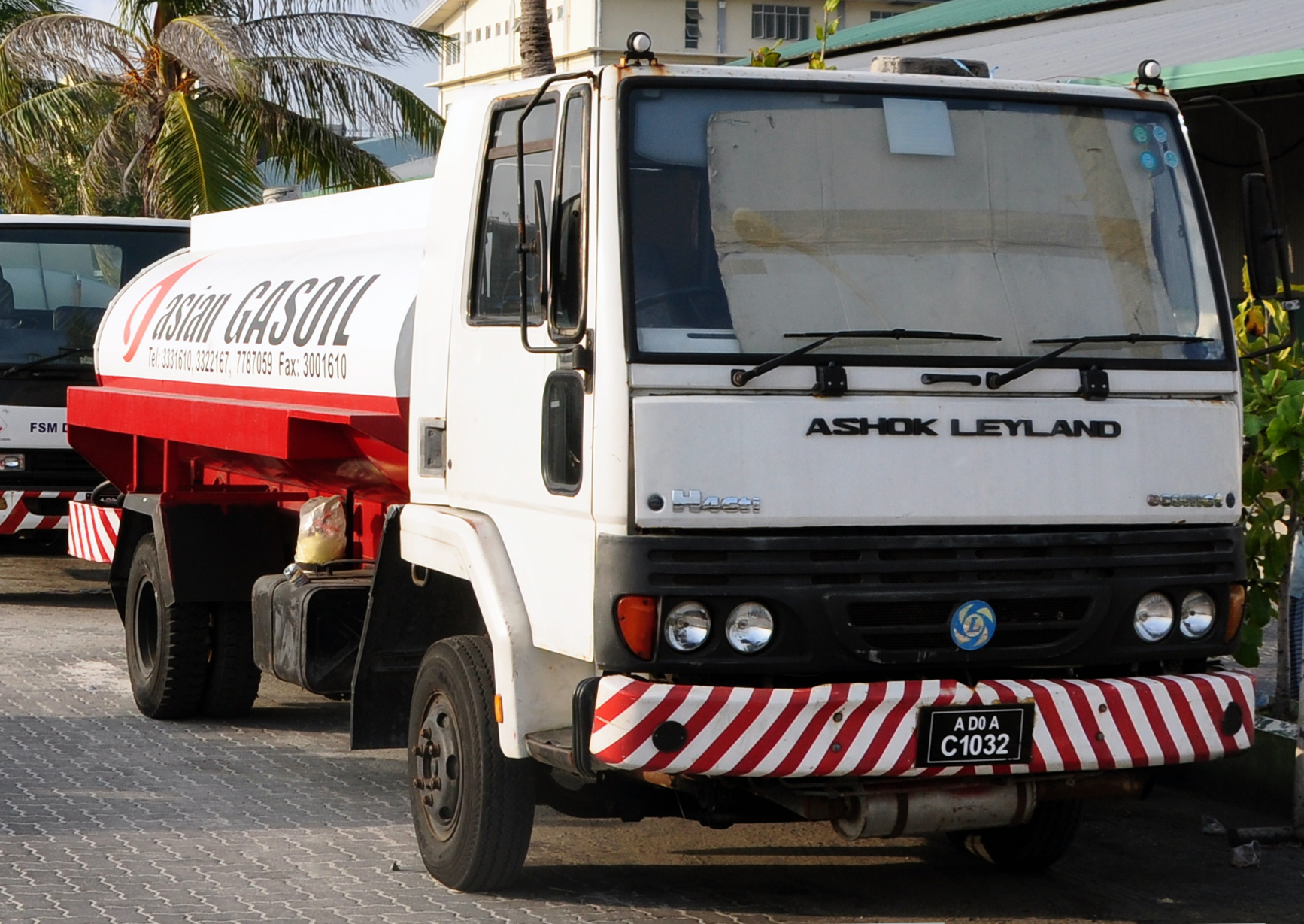
Current generation Ashok Leyland eComet

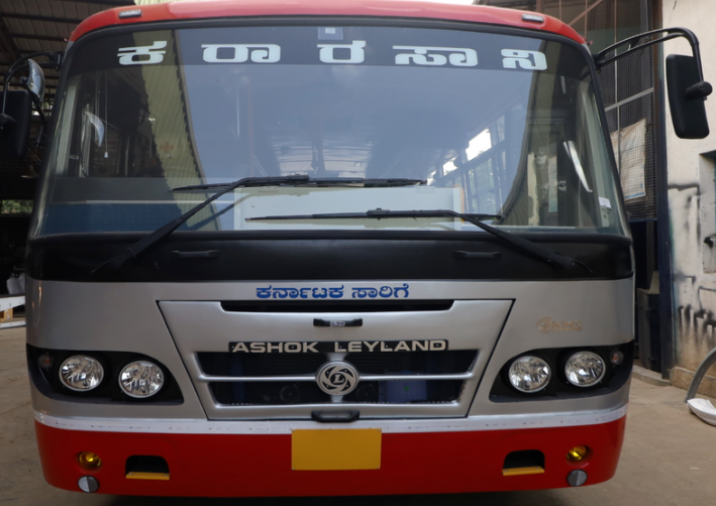
KSRTC'S Sarige bus

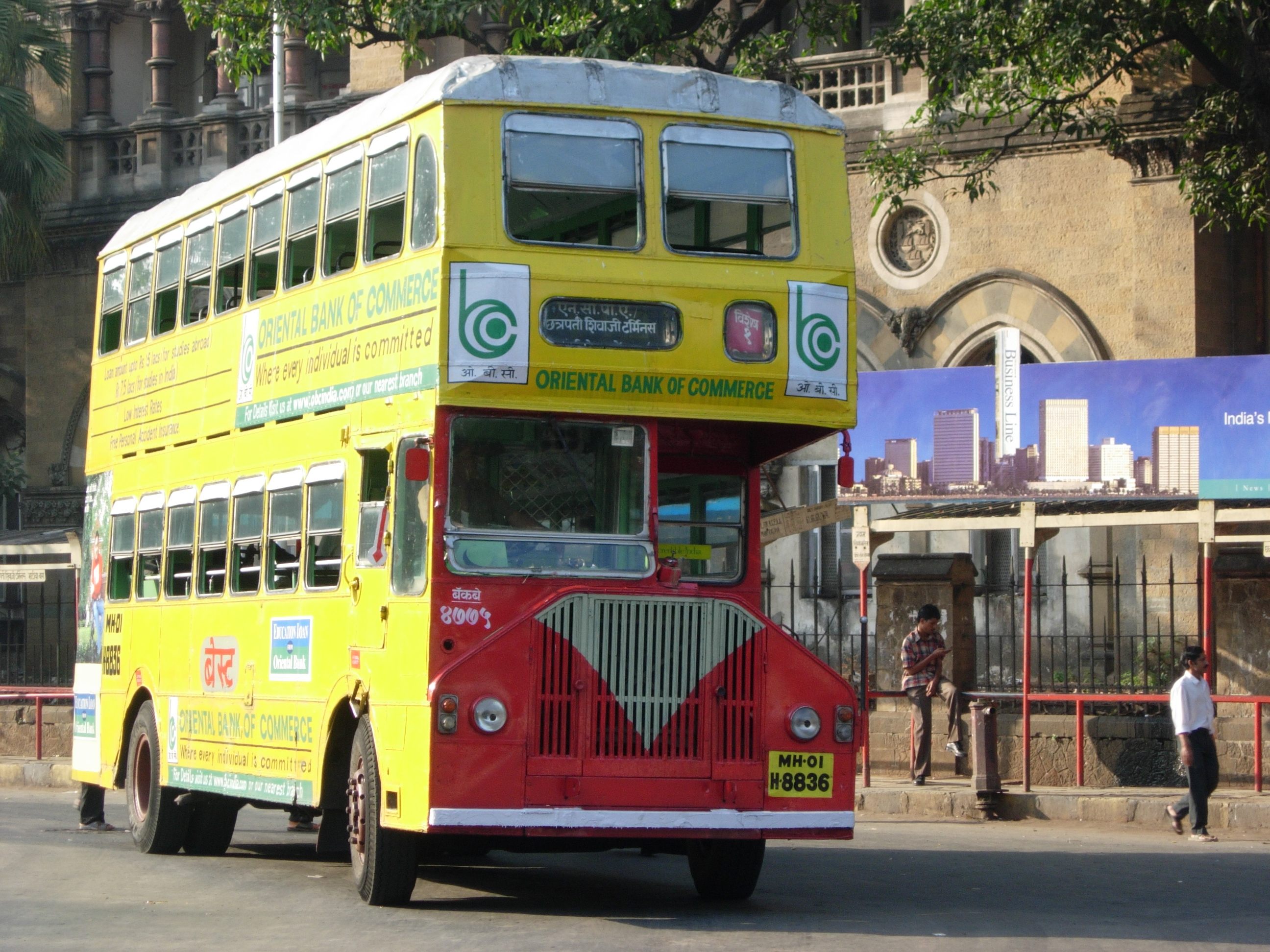
Ashok Leyland Titan Double Decker bus of BEST, Mumbai

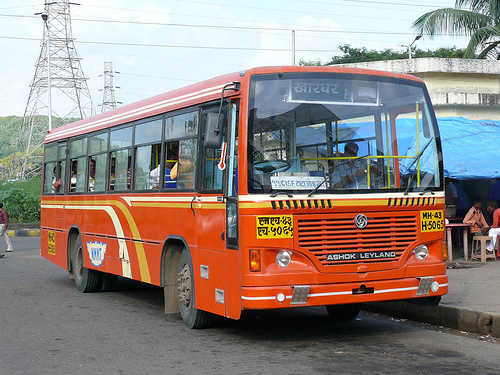
Ashok Leyland City Transit Bus in Navi Mumbai

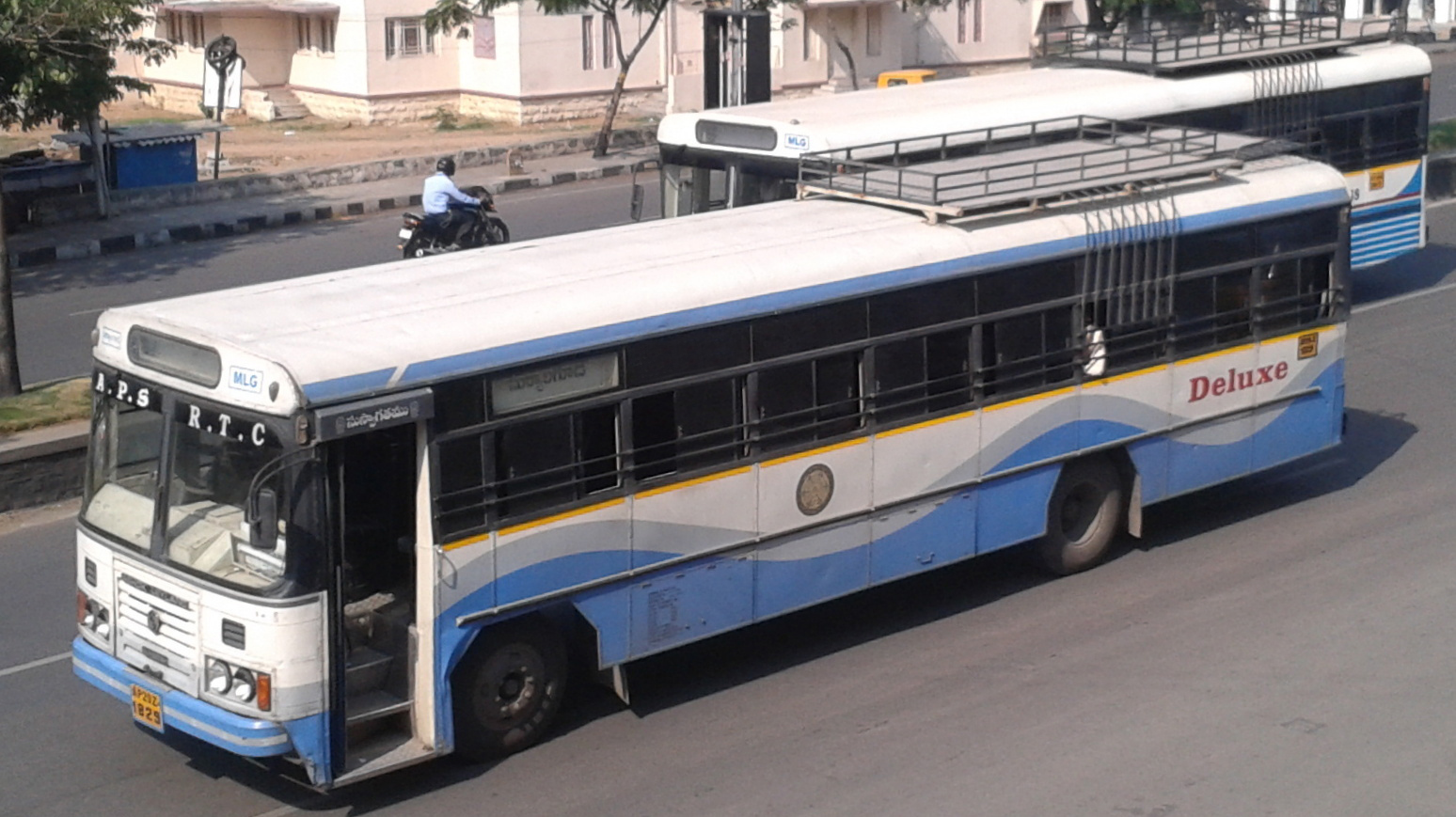
Ashok Leyland Inter-City Deluxe Bus operated by APSRTC

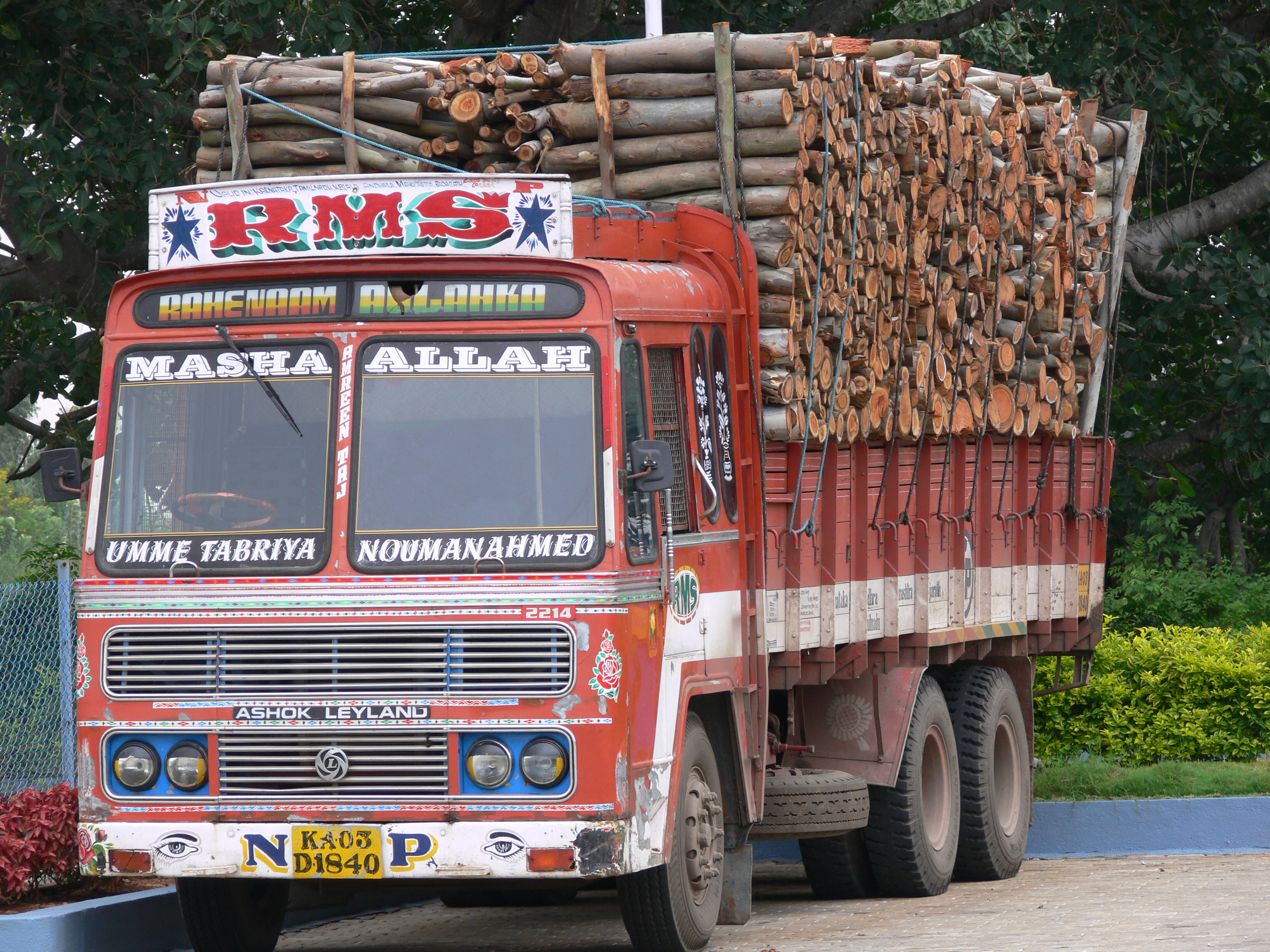
Ashok Leyland Tusker Twin Axle Lorry with custom built cabin, a regular sight on Indian highways

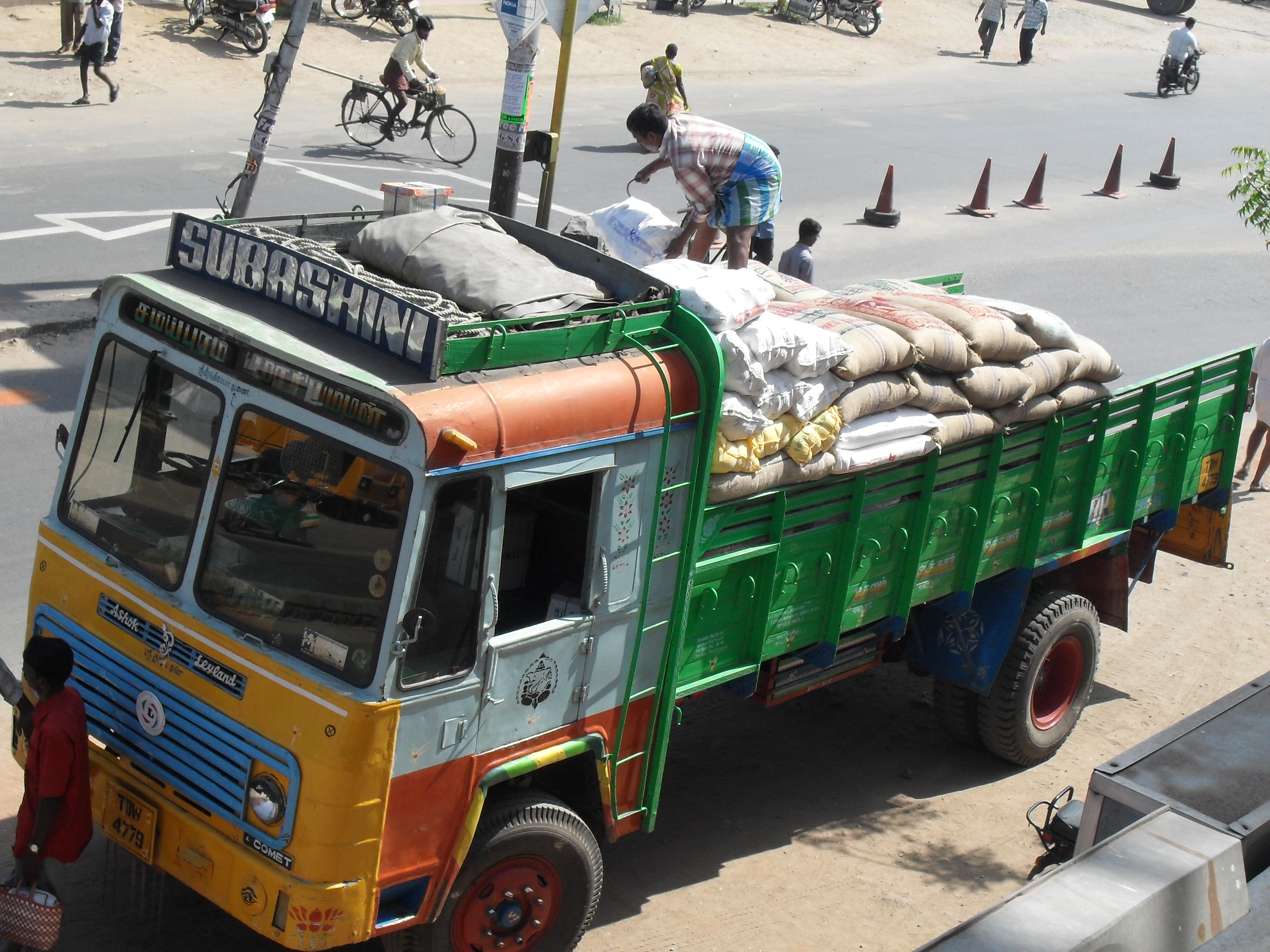
A 1980s-built short haul Ashok Leyland lorry in Tamil Nadu, still in operation

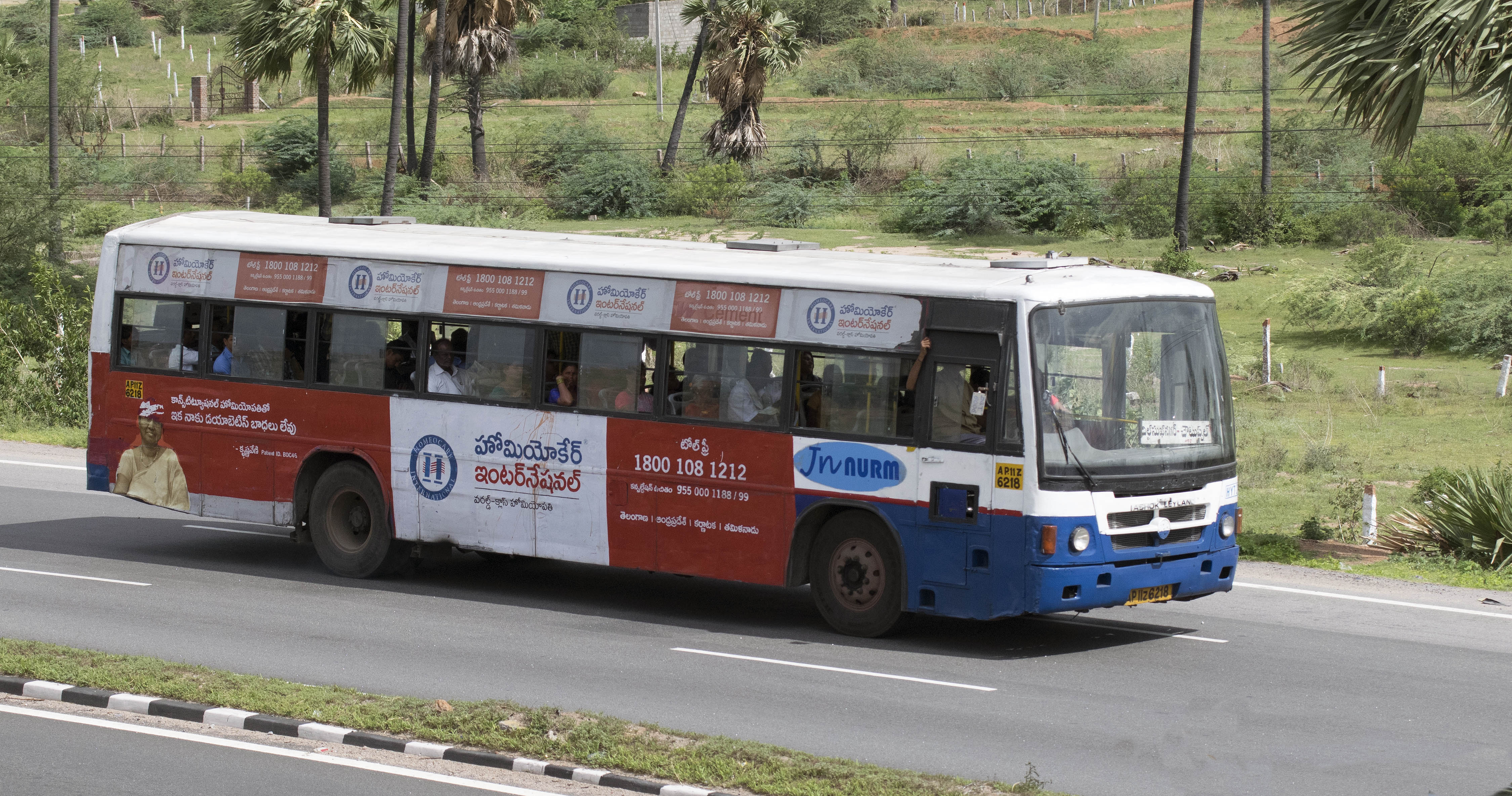
A Telangana State Road Transport Corporation TSRTC city bus in Hyderabad

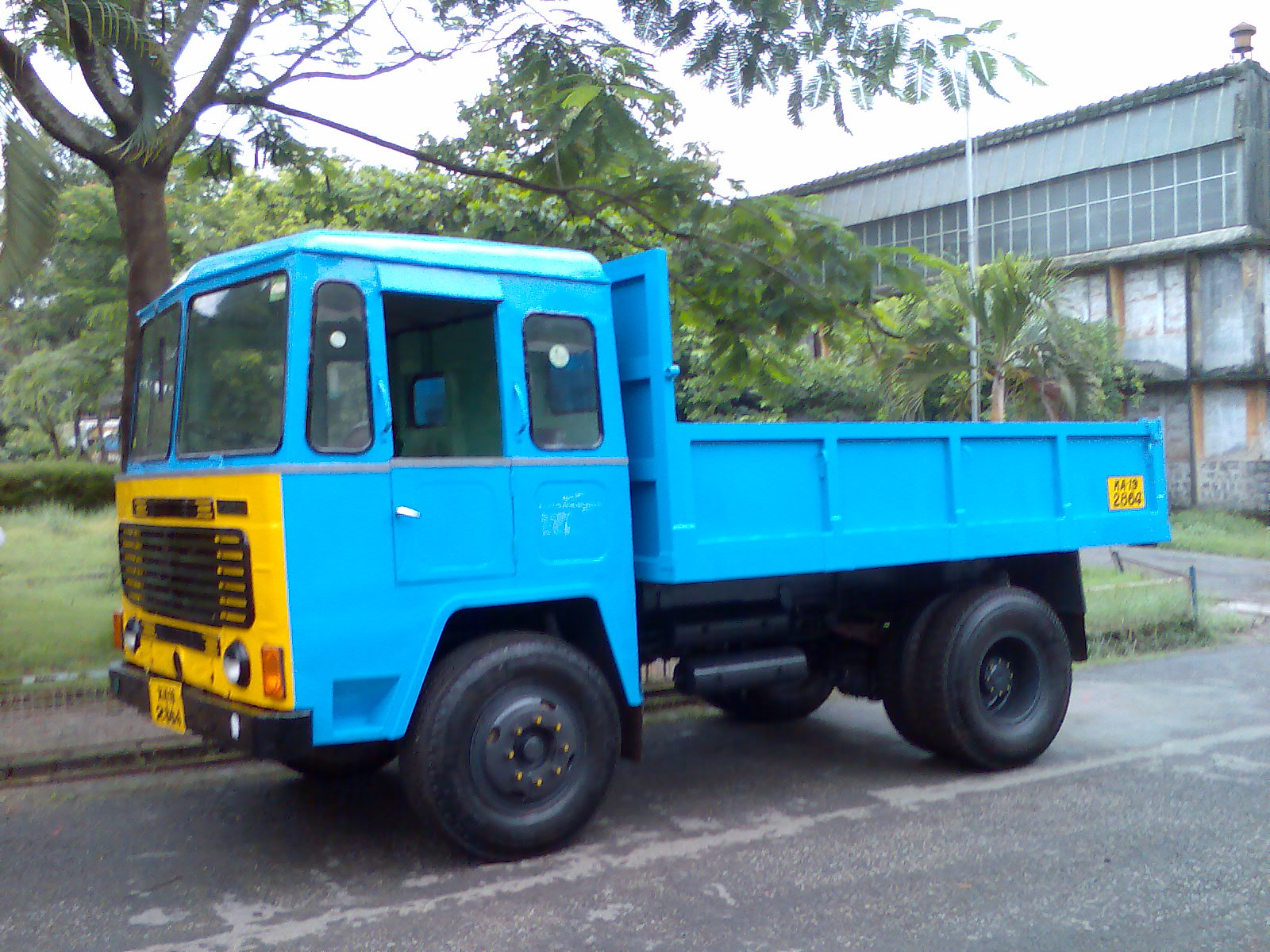
Ashok Leyland Comet tipper lorry

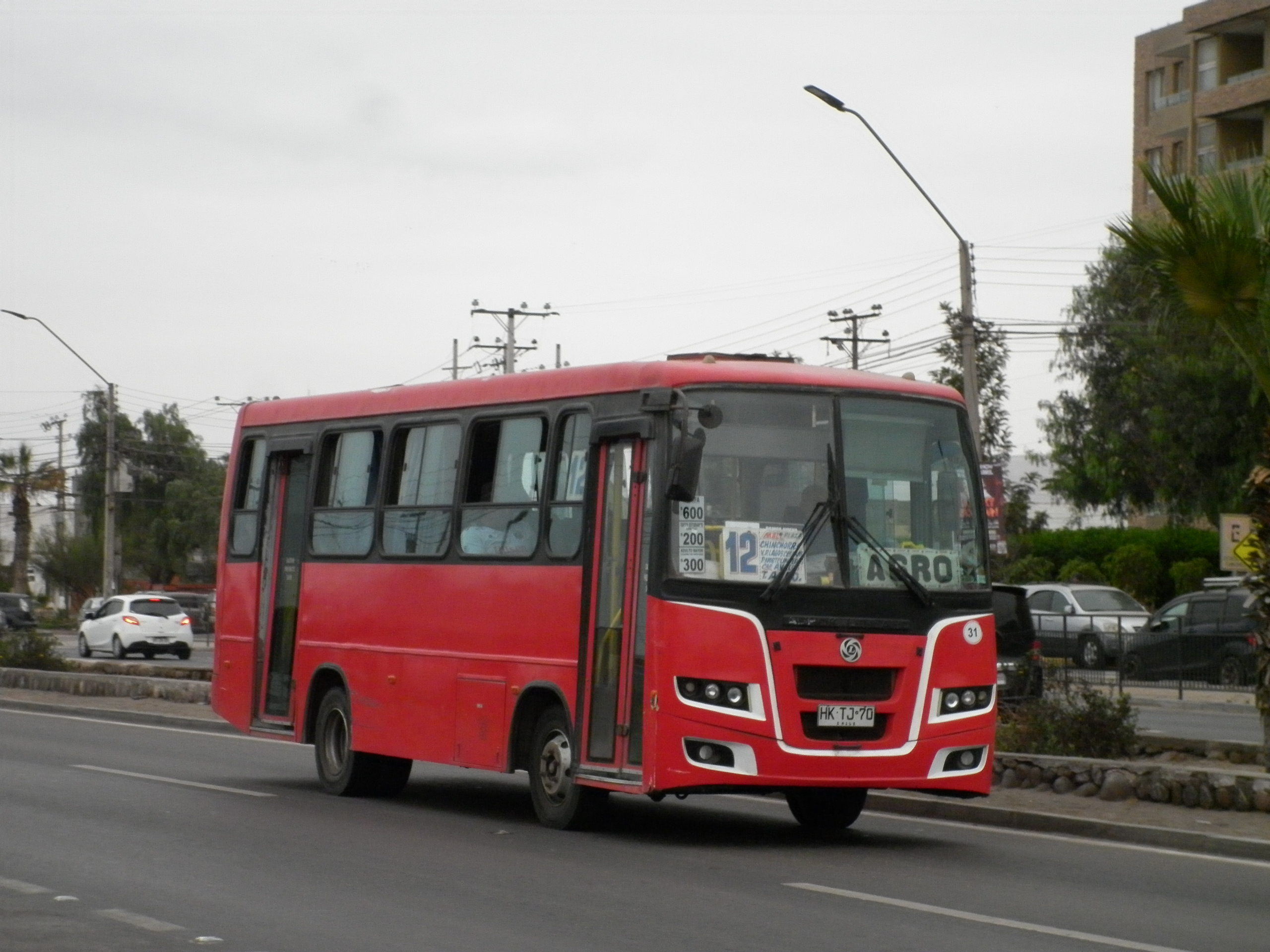
Ashok Leyland Eagle 814 in Arica, Chile

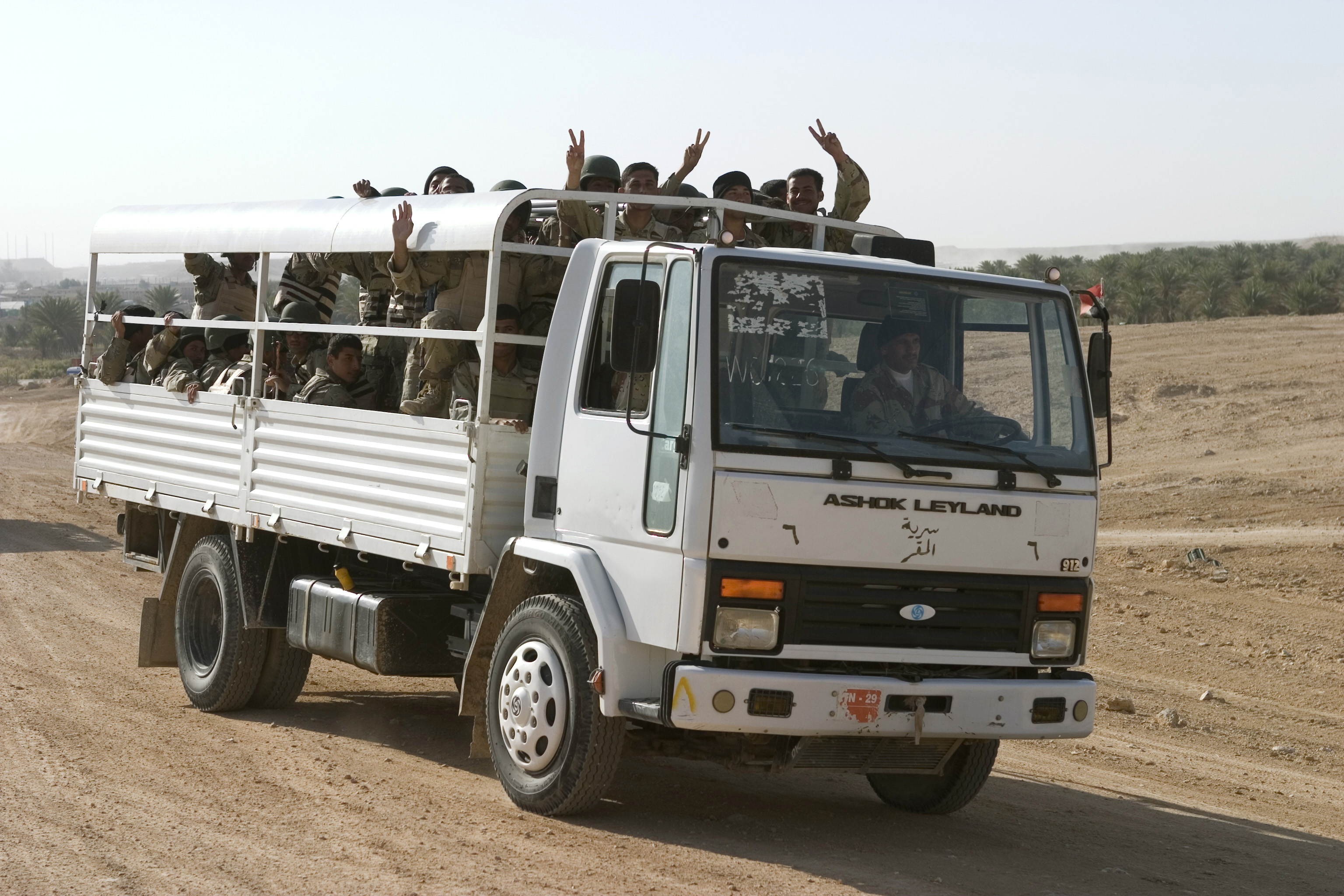
Ashok Leyland 1518, a rebadged Ford Cargo used by the Iraqi 2nd Brigade and 7th Iraqi Army Division at the Iraqi School of Infantry on Camp Yassir, Iraq.

=== Trucks ===
Current range

- General
- 1916 4x2
- 1920 4x2
- Boss

Boss is an intermediate commercial vehicle launched by Ashok Leyland. It is available in the range of 11T to 18.5T. The presently available models are:

- 1115
- 1215
- 1315
- 1415
- 1920
- Ecomet
- 1015
- 1115
- 1215
- 1415
- 1615
- AVTR Modular Platform
- 1920
- 2620 (Life Axle Technology)
- 2620 6x2 (Single-Tire Lift Axle)
- 2820 6x2
- 2820 6x4
- 2825
- 3120 6x2 (Double-Tire Lift Axle)
- 3520 8x2 (Single-Tire Lift Axle/Twin Steer)
- 3525 8x4
- 4020
- 4120 8x2 (Double-Tire Lift Axle)
- 4125 8x2 (Double-Tire Lift Axle)
- 4220 10x2
- 4225 10x2
- 4620
- 4825 10x2 (Double-Tire Lift Axle)
- 4825 10x4 (Double-Tire Lift Axle)
- 5225
- 5425
- 5525 4x2
- 5525 6x4

Former range

- Beaver
- Rhino
- U-Truck
- Captain

=== Light Vehicles ===
Current range

- Dost
- Bada Dost

The Dost is a 1.25 ton light commercial vehicle (LCV) that is the first product to be launched by the Indian-Japanese commercial vehicle joint venture Ashok Leyland Nissan Vehicles. Dost is powered by a 58 hp high-torque, 3-cylinder, turbo-charged common rail diesel engine and has a payload capacity of 1.25 tonnes. It is available in both BS3 and BS4 versions. The bodywork and some of the underpinnings relate to Nissan's C22 Vanette of the 1980s; this is most visible in the door design. The LCV is produced in Ashok Leyland's Hosur plant in Tamil Nadu. The LCV is available in three versions. With the launch of Dost Ashok Leyland has now entered the Light Commercial Vehicle segment in India

- STiLE

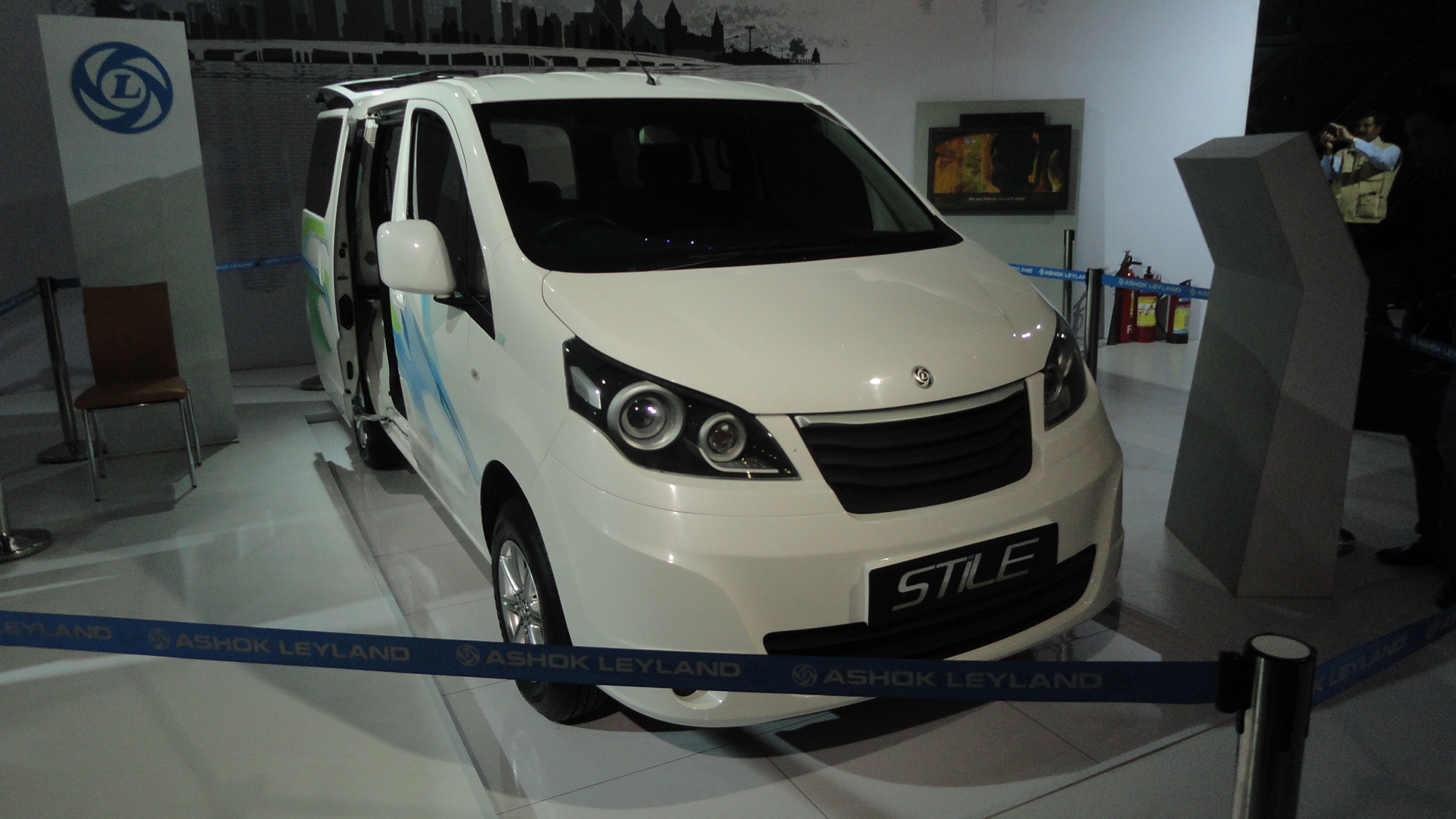
Ashok Leyland STiLE light commercial vehicle

STiLE is a multi-purpose vehicle which was manufactured by Ashok Leyland. The vehicle was unveiled during the 2012 Auto Expo and was launched in July 2013. STiLE was marketed as a "multi-purpose vehicle" for use as a hotel shuttle, taxi, ambulance, and panel van, and in courier service. In May 2015, Ashok Leyland stopped production due to low demand.

Diesel Generators Ashok Leyland offers Diesel Generators manufactured with Ashok Leyland engines and Leypower alternators. Currently they manufacture 5 to 2250 kVA Silent DG Sets.

== Subsidiary ventures ==
=== Construction equipment ===
In June 2009 the company expanded into construction equipment segment, with a 50:50 joint venture with John Deere. It was floated as a separate entity under the name of Leyland – Deere Limited.

=== Ashok Leyland Defence Systems ===
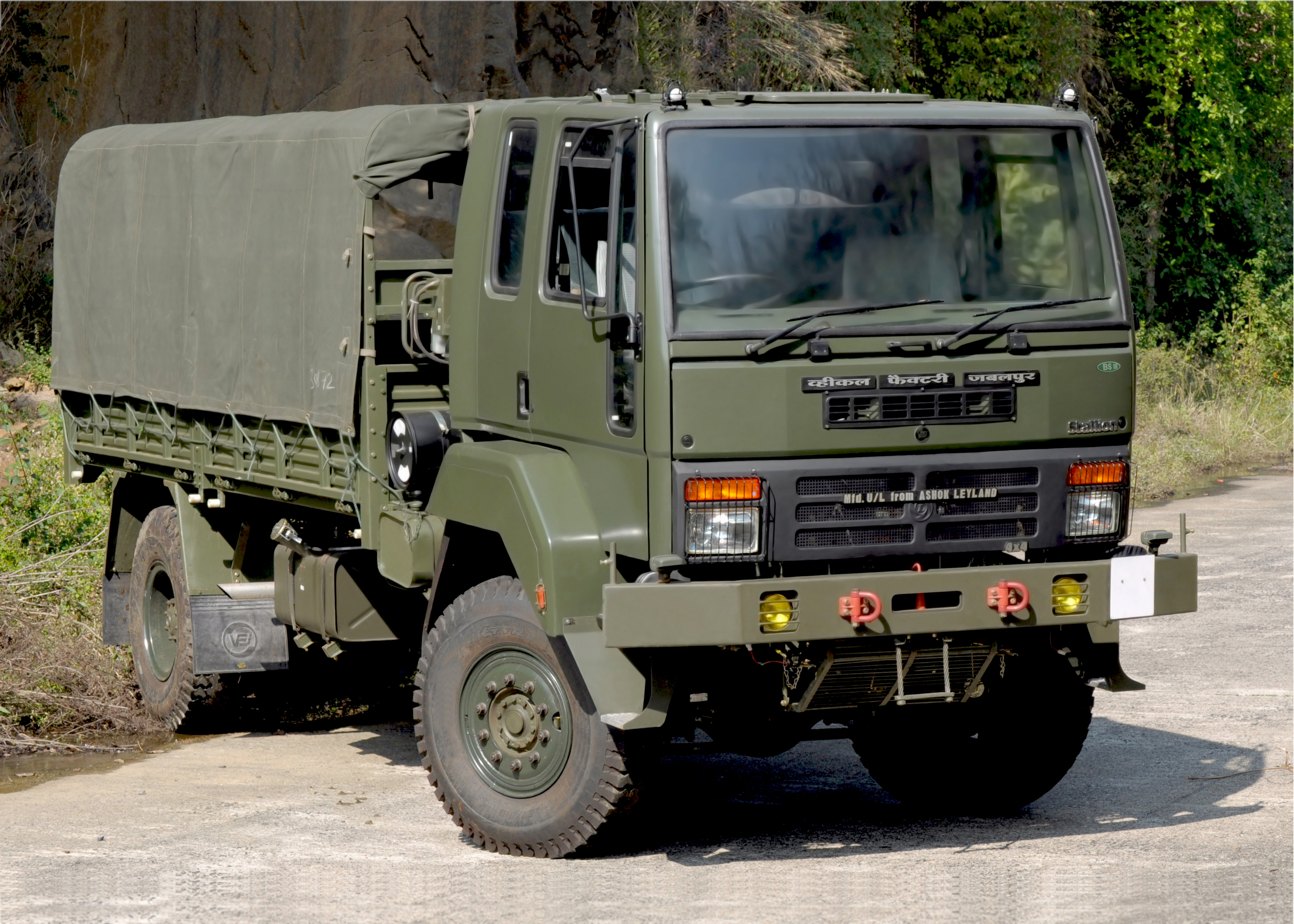
Vehicle Factory Jabalpur (VFJ)'s Stallion 4X4 Truck for the Indian Army

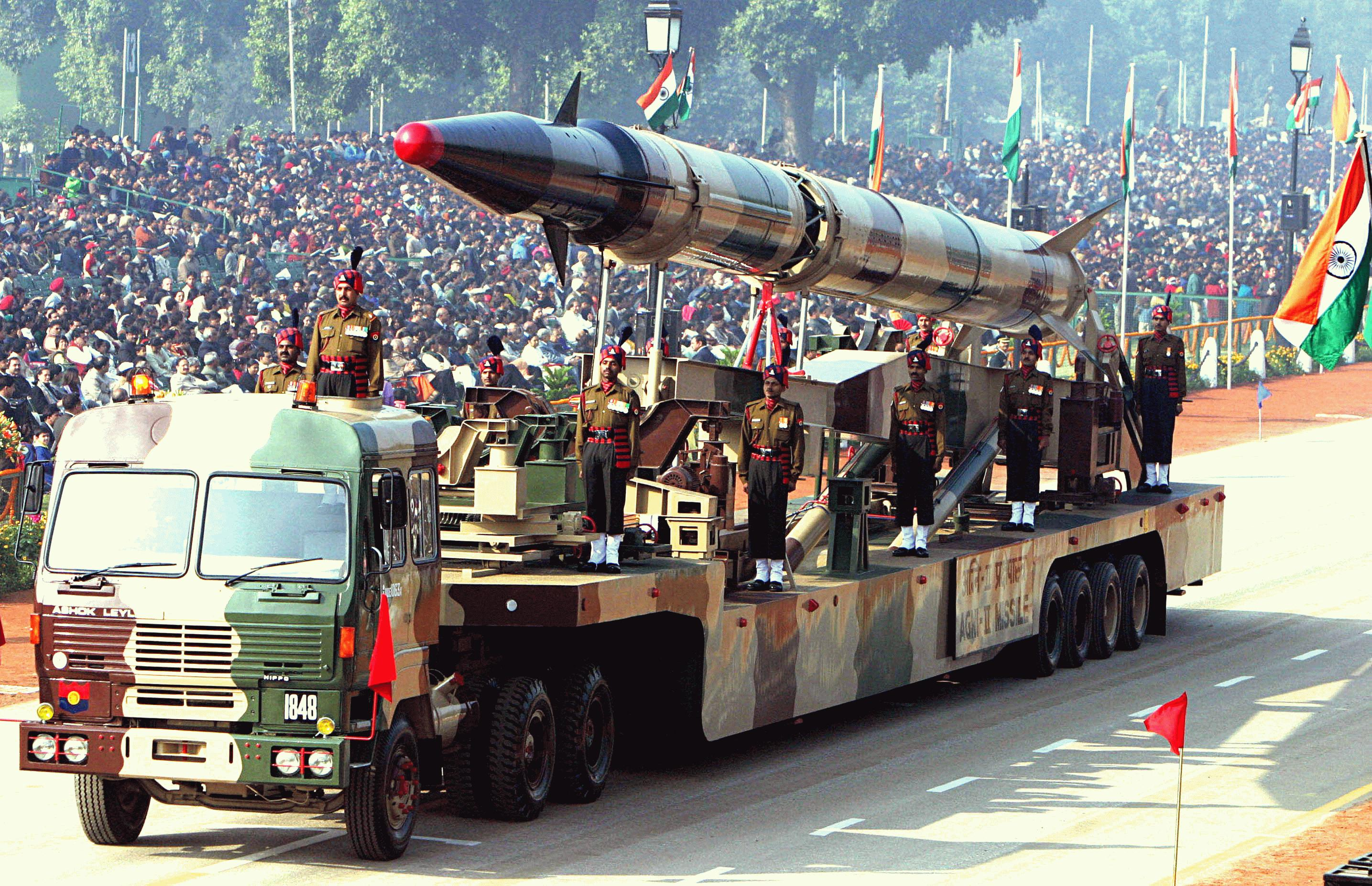
An Indian road-mobile launcher with a ballistic missile

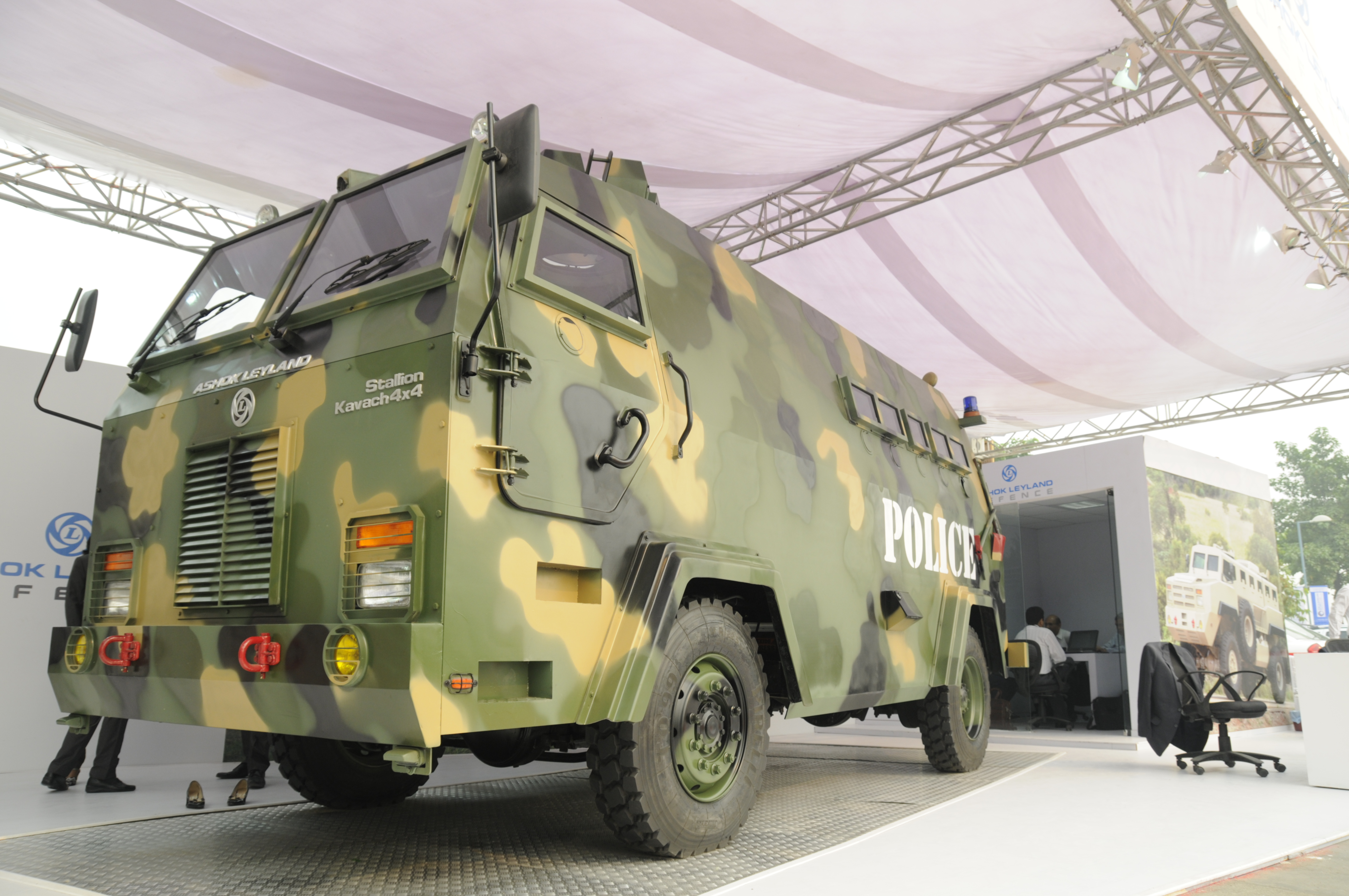
Ashok Leyland's Stallion Kavach 4X4 Mine Protection Armoured Vehicle

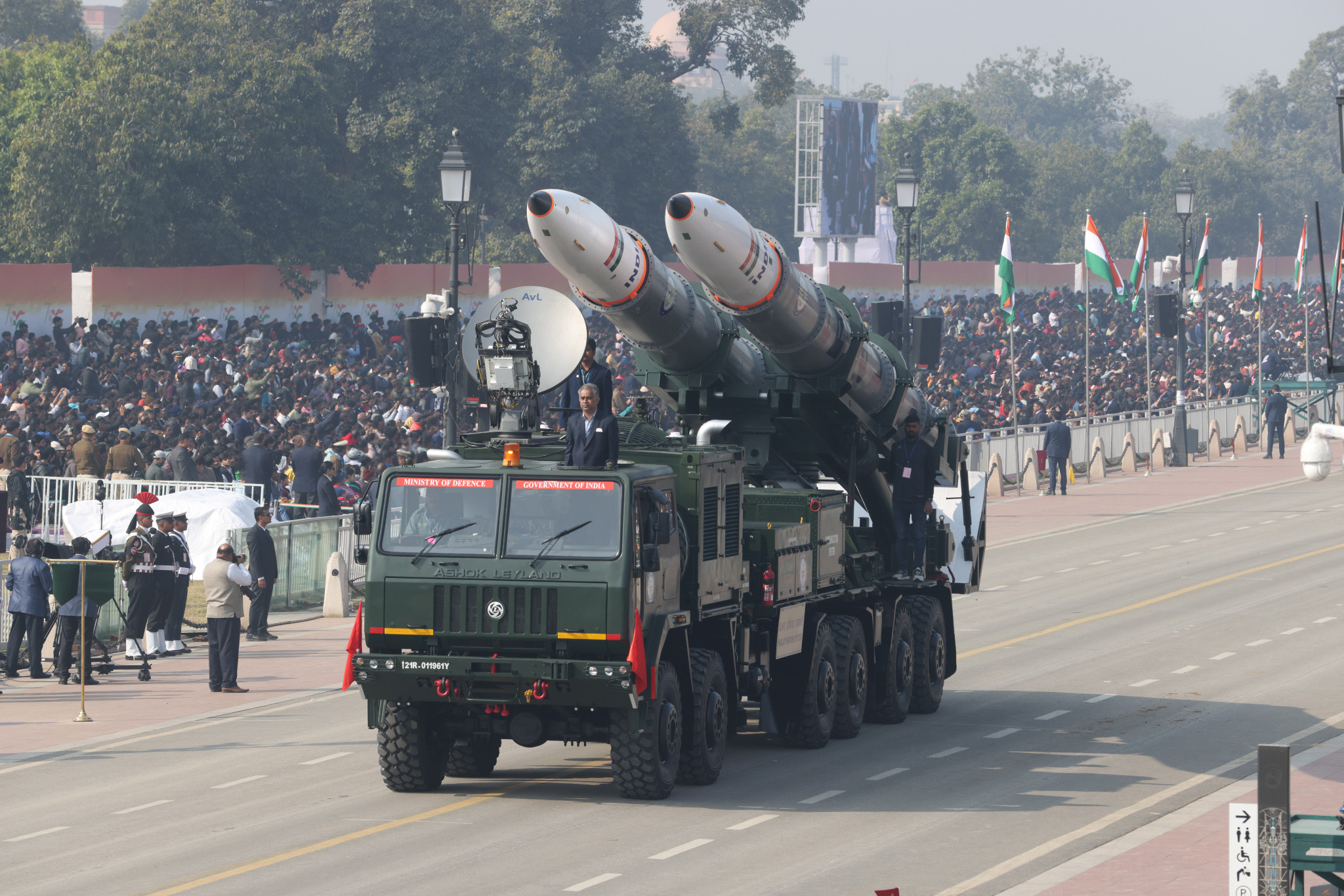
Pralay missiles on Ashok Leyland 12×12 high mobility vehicle.

Ashok Leyland Defence Systems (ALDS) is a newly floated company by the Hinduja Group. Ashok Leyland holds 26 percent in Ashok Leyland Defence Systems (ALDS). The company designs and develops defence logistics and tactical vehicles, defence communication and other systems. Ashok Leyland is the largest supplier of logistics vehicles to the Indian Army. It has supplied over 60,000 of its Stallion vehicles, all manufactured at the Vehicle Factory Jabalpur (VFJ).

== International operations and exports ==
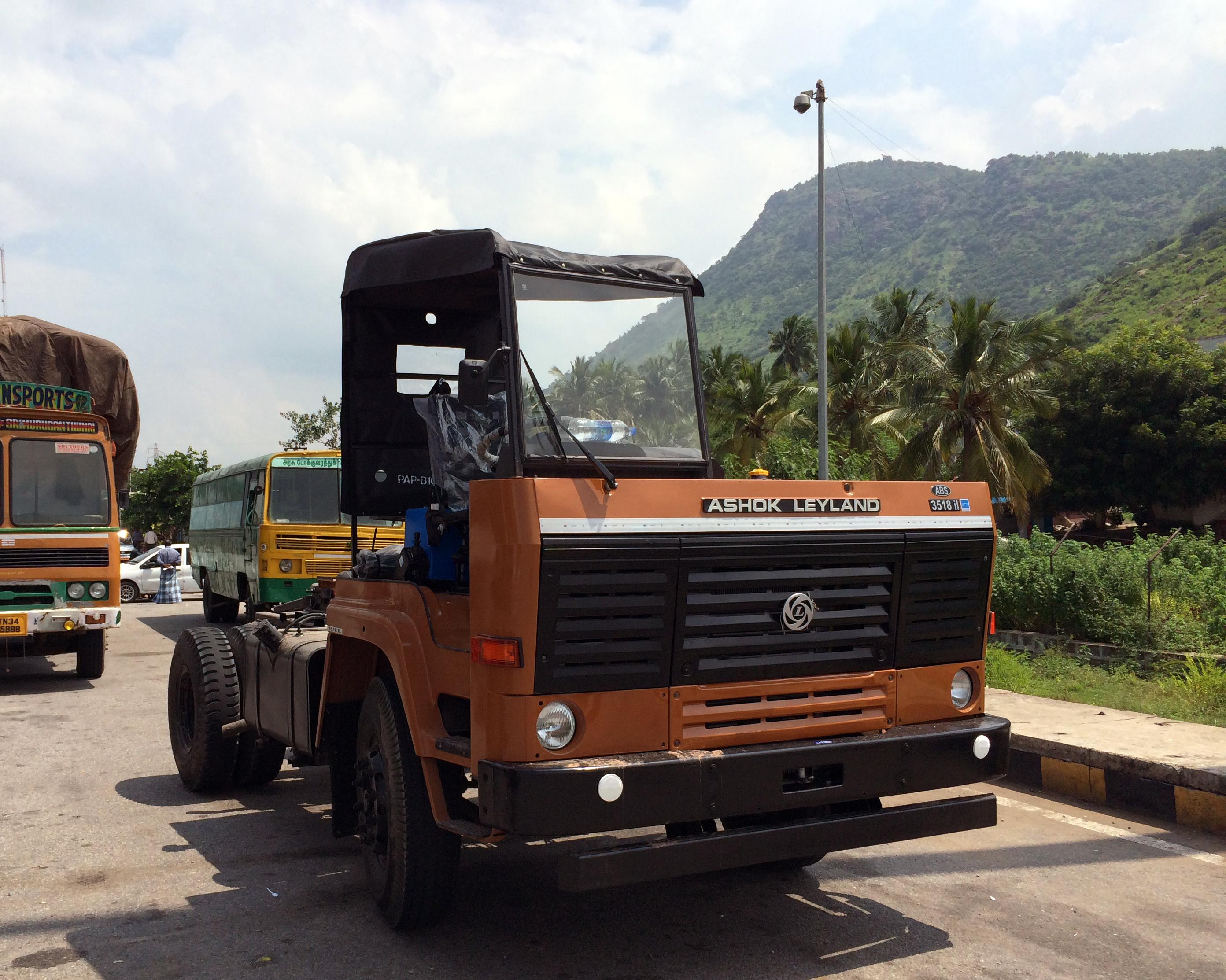
A new Ashok Leyland 3518iL chassis unit for custom built cab and load body

Exports of commercial vehicles contribute to a seven percent share of Ashok Leyland's total revenues.

The company has a presence in SAARC countries like Bangladesh, Sri Lanka and Nepal, and in the Middle East countries where it exports 3600–4000 units a year. The company has an assembly unit, mainly for buses, in Ras Al Khaimah in UAE to cater to the Gulf Cooperation Council (GCC) member states. This unit currently assembles 4000 units, which the company plans to increase to 6000 units.

Ashok Leyland exports medium and heavy commercial vehicles to Arab countries like Bahrain, Jordan, Kuwait, Oman, Qatar, Saudi Arabia, UAE and Yemen; former Soviet Union countries like Azerbaijan, Armenia, Belarus, Georgia, Kazakhstan, Kyrgyzstan, Moldova, Russia, Tajikistan, Turkmenistan, Uzbekistan and Ukraine; Sub-Saharan Africa; Sri Lanka; Bangladesh; Nepal; the Philippines; Thailand and Malaysia. Every year Ashok Leyland exports about 12000 trucks to Bangladesh and Sri Lanka.

On 11 June 2012, Ashok Leyland supplied 100 Falcon buses to Ghana for $7.6 million (about ₹42 crore). Ashok Leyland was awarded the first overseas order worth $6 million for its vestibule buses from Bangladesh Road Transport Corporation (BRTC).

=== Lanka Ashok Leyland ===
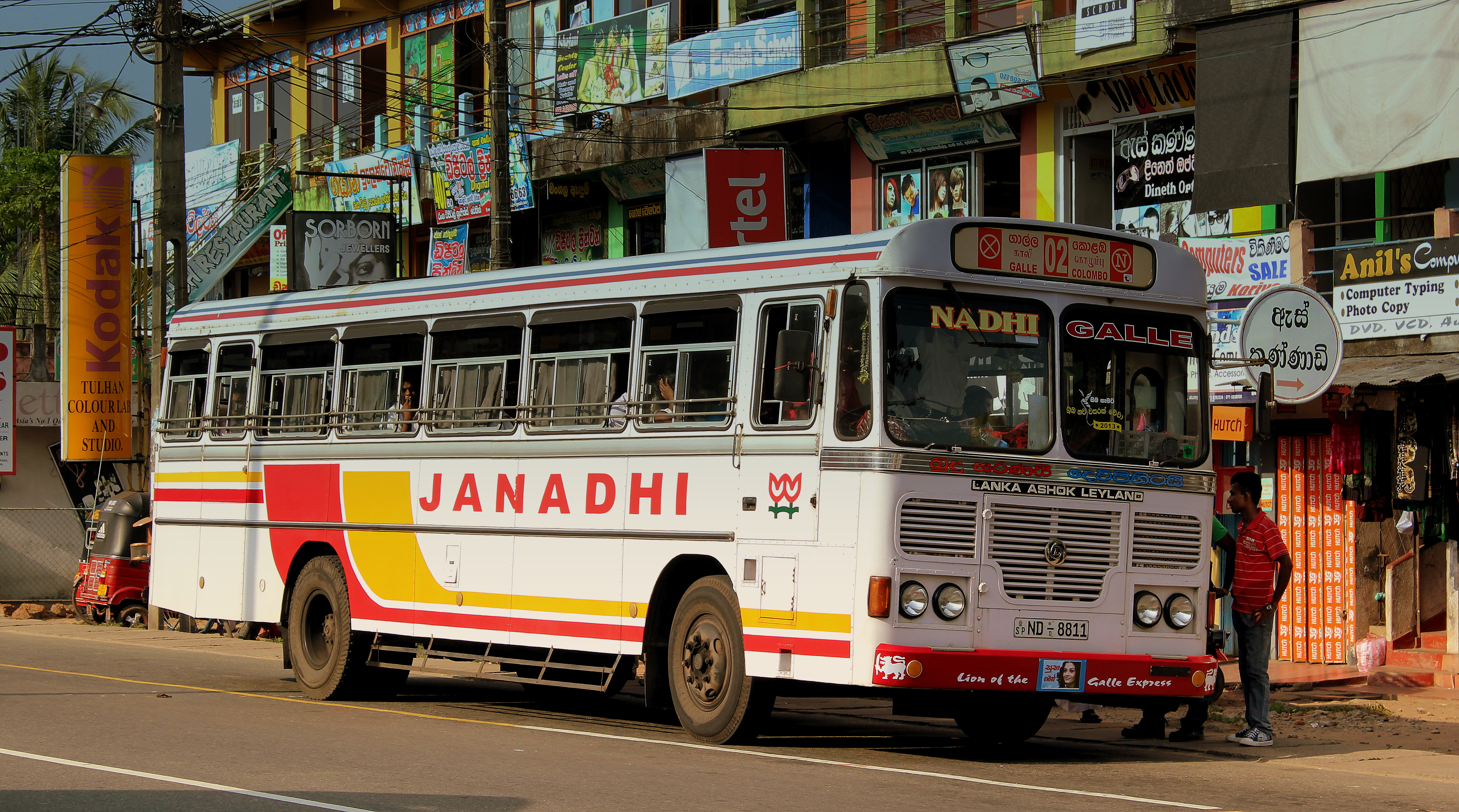
A Lanka Ashok Leyland bus in Sri Lanka in 2013

Lanka Ashok Leyland (LAL) in Sri Lanka was formed in 1982 and started its operations in 1983 as a joint venture between Lanka Leyland Ltd (a wholly owned company of the Government of Sri Lanka) and Ashok Leyland Ltd India. LAL imports commercial vehicles in both knock down kits and fully built, and carries out assembly operations, repair and service, and body building on chassis.

=== Switch Mobility ===
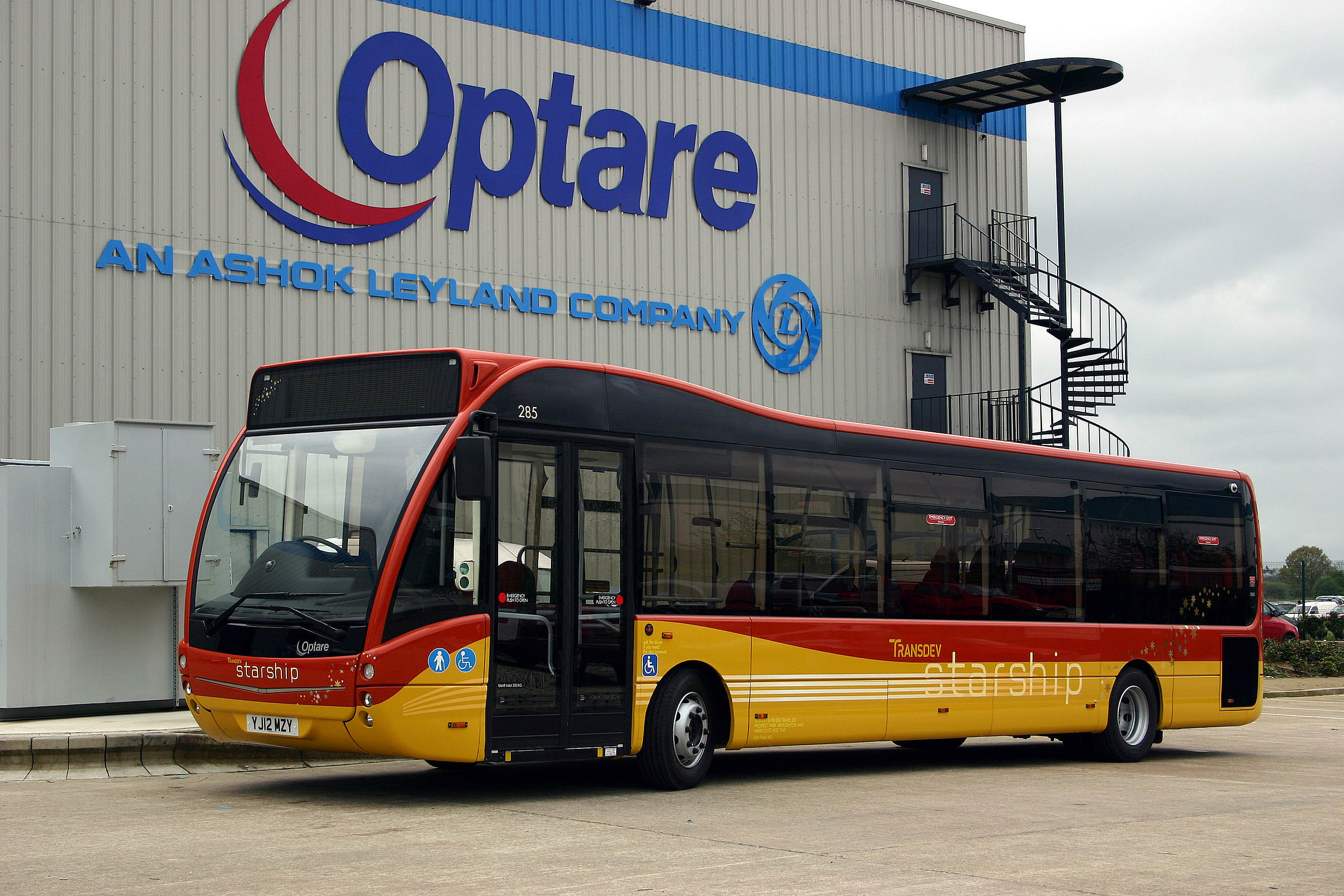
An Optare Versa parked outside Optare's Sherburn-in-Elmet factory

In 2010 Ashok Leyland acquired a 26% stake in the British bus manufacturer Optare, a company that was originally based on the premises of a former British Leyland subsidiary Charles H Roe before moving to the new purpose-built factory in 2011 in Sherburn-in-Elmet. In 2017, Ashok Leyland acquired a further 72.31% stake in Optare increasing its overall stake to 98.31%.In 2018, the stake was further raised to 99.08%. In November 2020, Ashok Leyland announced that Optare would be rebranded as Switch Mobility.

== Technology ==
=== Hythane engines ===
Ashok Leyland has also developed hythane engines in association with the Australian company Eden Energy. Ashok Leyland developed a 6-cylinder, 6-litre (370 cu in) 92 kW (123 hp) BS-4 engine which uses hythane (H-CNG,) which is a blend of natural gas and around 20% of hydrogen. A 4-cylinder 4-litre (240 cu in) 63 kW (84 hp) engine is also being developed for H-CNG blend in a joint R&D program with MNRE (Ministry of New and Renewable Energy) and Indian Oil Corporation.

=== Hybrid technology ===
==== Non-plugin Hybrid Bus ====
At the Delhi Auto Expo 2016, Ashok Leyland introduced an advanced non-plug-in version of HYBUS. This model is powered by an H-Series 6-cylinder diesel engine (BS IV compliant), which is not used to drive the vehicle forward but to charge the ultra-capacitors that power the 150 kW electric motor. An automatic start-stop system is employed to reduce overall engine idling time. The bus can restart using the stored energy when the engine is off, enhancing fuel efficiency and decreasing NVH (noise, vibration, and harshness) levels.

=== Electric Technology ===
In 2016 the company launched the country's first indigenously produced fully electric bus, called Circuit. The bus is a zero-emission vehicle that can run 120 km on a single charge, and has an alert system that can signal if the bus is low on power. The bus will be introduced under the National Electric Mobility Plan with an aim of 20% penetration of electric or hybrid vehicles by 2020.

=== Euro VI Truck ===
AT the Delhi Auto Expo 2016, the company showcased its first indigenously produced Euro VI truck 4940. The truck is powered by the company's flagship range of engine, Neptune, which is an 8l engine that produces 400 hp and 1600Nm of torque. The truck is designed to meet Euro VI norms.

=== iEGR ===
In 2017, the company showcased iEGR (intelligent exhaust gas recirculation) technology for its trucks and buses to meet BS-IV emission standards. The technology also promises other advantages like better fuel efficiency than BS-III trucks, and power transmission up to 400 HP.

=== iBUS ===
Ashok Leyland announced iBUS in the beginning of 2008, as part of the future for the country's increasingly traffic-clogged major cities. Its Rs 6-million iBus is a feature-filled, low-floor concept bus for the metros revealed during the Auto Expo 2008 in India. This low-floored iBus will have the first of its kind features, including anti-lock braking system, electronic engine management and passenger infotainment. The executive class has an airline-like ambiance with wide LCD screens, reading lights, audio speakers and, for the first time, Internet on the move. A GPS system enables vehicle tracking and display of dynamic route information on LCD screens, which can also support infotainment packages including live data and news. The bus will probably be equipped with an engine from the new Neptune family, which Ashok Leyland also introduced at this exhibition, which is ready for the BS4/Euro 4 emission regulations and can be upgraded to Euro 5. Leyland's iBus has hybrid technology.

== Awards and recognition ==
- In 2019, the company was awarded the AON Best Employers for India award.
- In 2019, Ashok Leyland was ranked as 34th best brand in India by Interbrand.

== See also ==
- British Leyland
- Leyland Motors
