= SUN Mobility =

Indian electric vehicle energy service provider

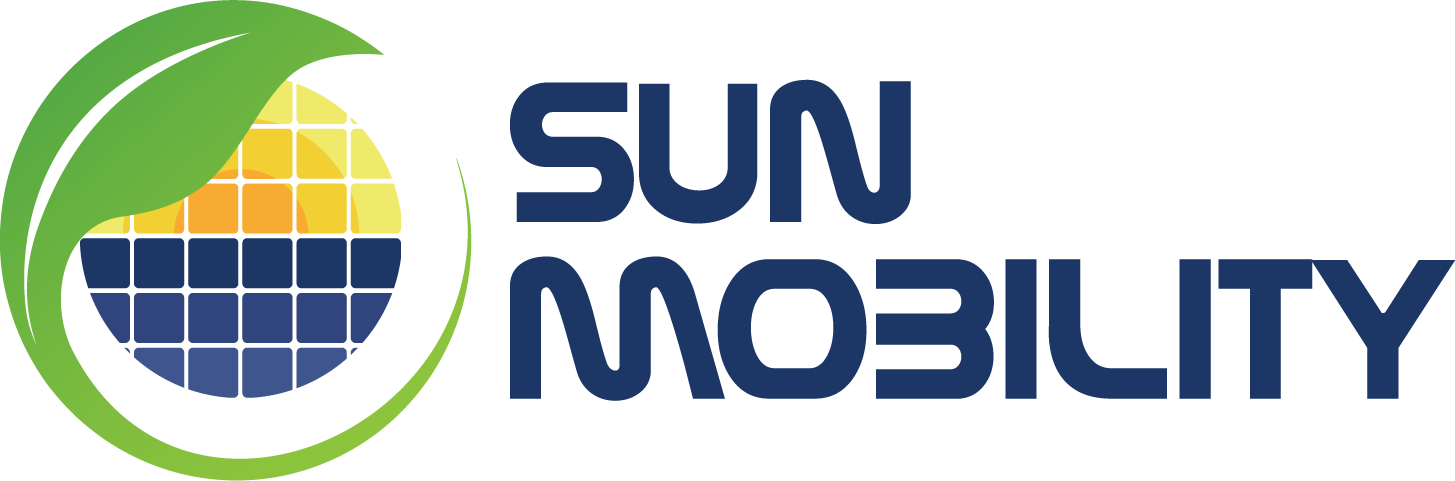
- Logo since 2019
- Company type: Private
- Industry: Automotive
- Founded: 2017; 9 years ago
- Founders: Chetan Maini, Uday Khemka, Ajay Goel
- Headquarters: Bengaluru, India
- Key people: Chetan Maini (Chairperson).
- Products: Electric Vehicle Infrastructure
- Services: EV Battery Swapping & Energy Infrastructure
- Number of employees: 500
- Parent: SUN Mobility PTE, Singapore
- Website: www.sunmobility.com

SUN Mobility is an electric vehicle energy services company founded in 2017 that develops, manufactures and operates battery swapping infrastructure for electric two-wheelers, three-wheelers, and larger commercial vehicles. Battery swapping technology helps accelerate the faster adoption of electric vehicles due to the lower upfront purchase price of electric vehicles, and the lower running costs - particularly in the case of commercial applications.

The company is a joint venture between the SUN Group and the Maini Group, both companies in the areas of electric mobility and clean energy. The company is co-founded by Chetan Maini, the founder of the Reva Electric Car Company (now known as Mahindra Last Mile Mobility Limited), Uday Khemka, Vice Chairman of SUN Group, and Ajay Goel, Co-Founder & Executive Director. Anant Badjatya is the current CEO of the India business, since March 2022.

== History ==
In 2019, Bosch (company) invested $25 million SUN Mobility and has since been a technology partner. Vitol, the Dutch oil trading organization, is also an investor in the company having made an investment of $50 million in 2021.

In 2023, SUN Mobility began international operations with Shell being a partner in the Philippines.

== Operations ==
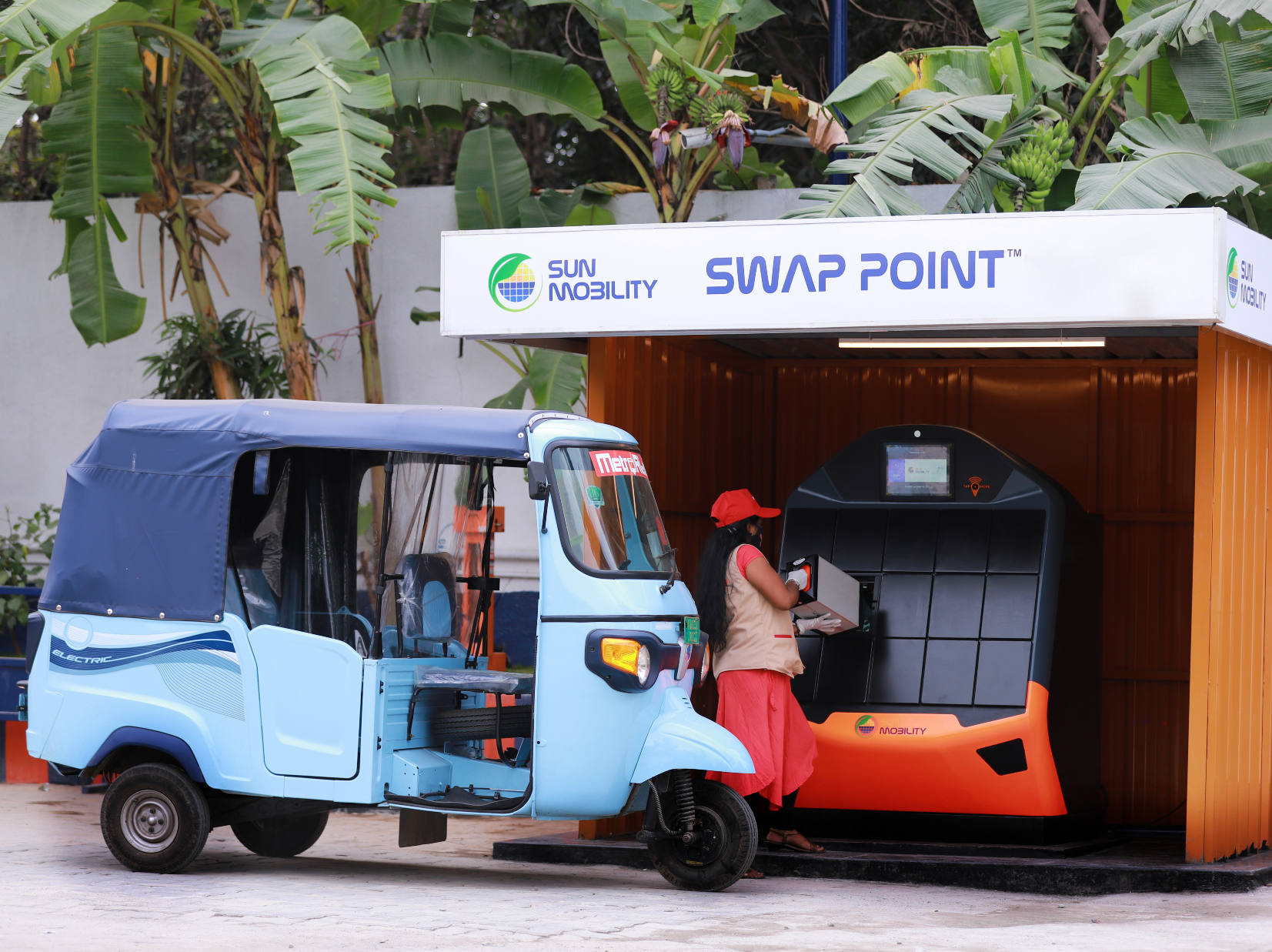
A lady swapping passenger auto-rickshaw batteries at a SUN Mobility Swap Point

Battery swapping as a technology addresses common roadblocks to electric vehicle adoption such as high up-front costs, range anxiety, battery management concerns, and battery pack obsolescence. SUN Mobility's battery swapping technology enables users to purchase their electric vehicles without a fixed battery pack, and subscribe to a battery swapping service that allows them to simply swap a depleted battery for a fully charged, temperature-controlled battery pack.

SUN Mobility offers Battery-as-a-Service (BaaS) and Mobility-as-a-Service (MaaS) as two solutions to its customers.

SUN Mobility operates over 600 battery swapping points across India, and has the leading market share in e-auto and e-loader (three-wheeler cargo vehicle) categories, the highest market share in swappable e-bikes, and about 50% market share in e-rickshaws in northern India.

== Products and services ==
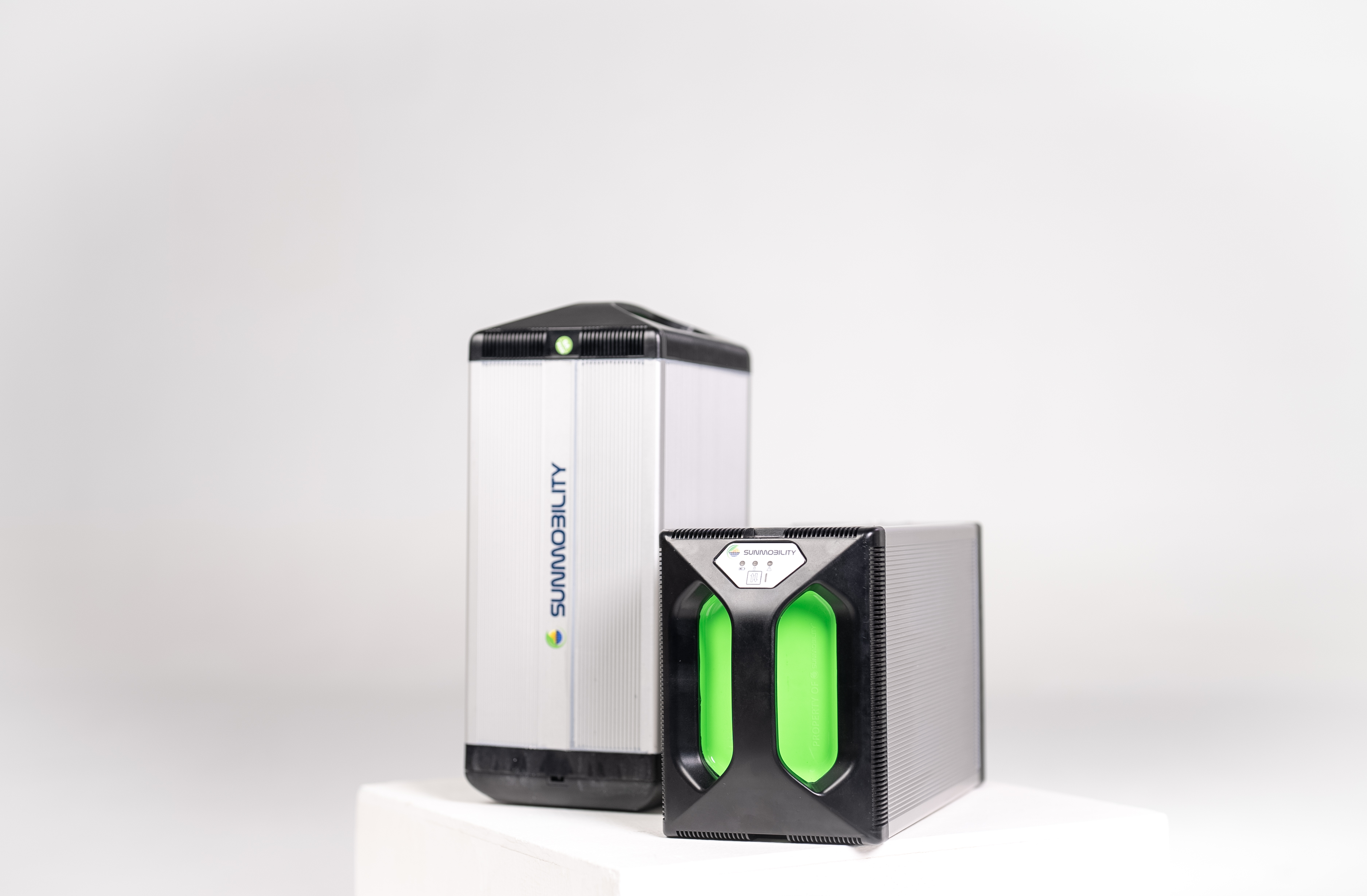
The second-gen Battery Pack 'S2.1', launched in January 2023

SUN Mobility provides modular Smart Batteries that are smaller and lighter than conventional fixed EV batteries, and are swappable in a few minutes. The second-generation Smart battery S2.1 was launched at the Delhi Auto Expo in January 2023. This new model of battery offers a higher capacity compared to earlier generations and comes with enhanced safety features.

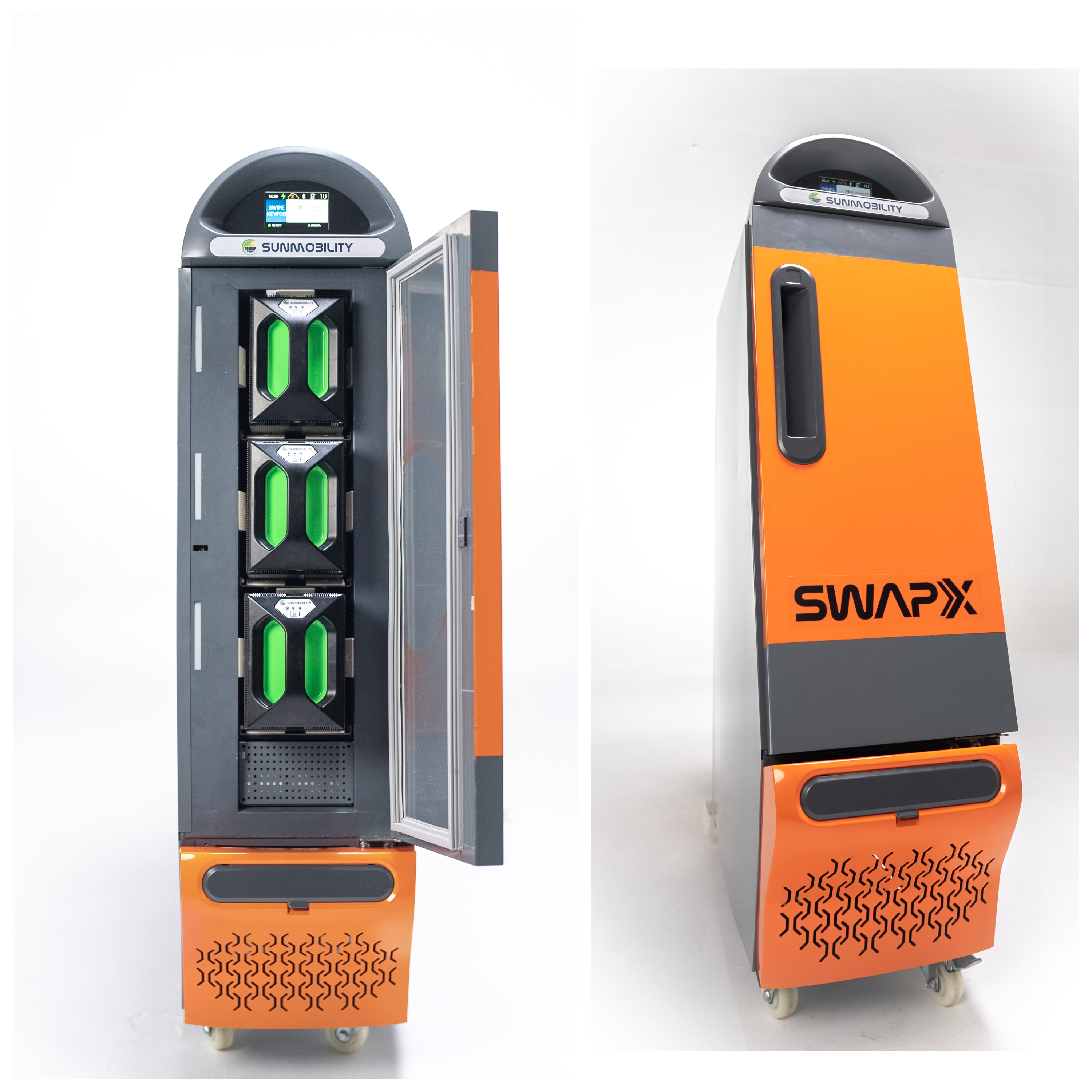
The 3-dock Swap Station 'SwapX' launched in January 2023

The SwapX is a battery swapping station that was developed by SUN Mobility to improve the density of the battery swapping network. SwapX was launched in January 2023 at the Delhi Auto Expo. It comes with 3 docks and can be installed within an area of 4.5 to 6 sq. feet, requiring a 15A power supply to operate.

== Partners and network ==
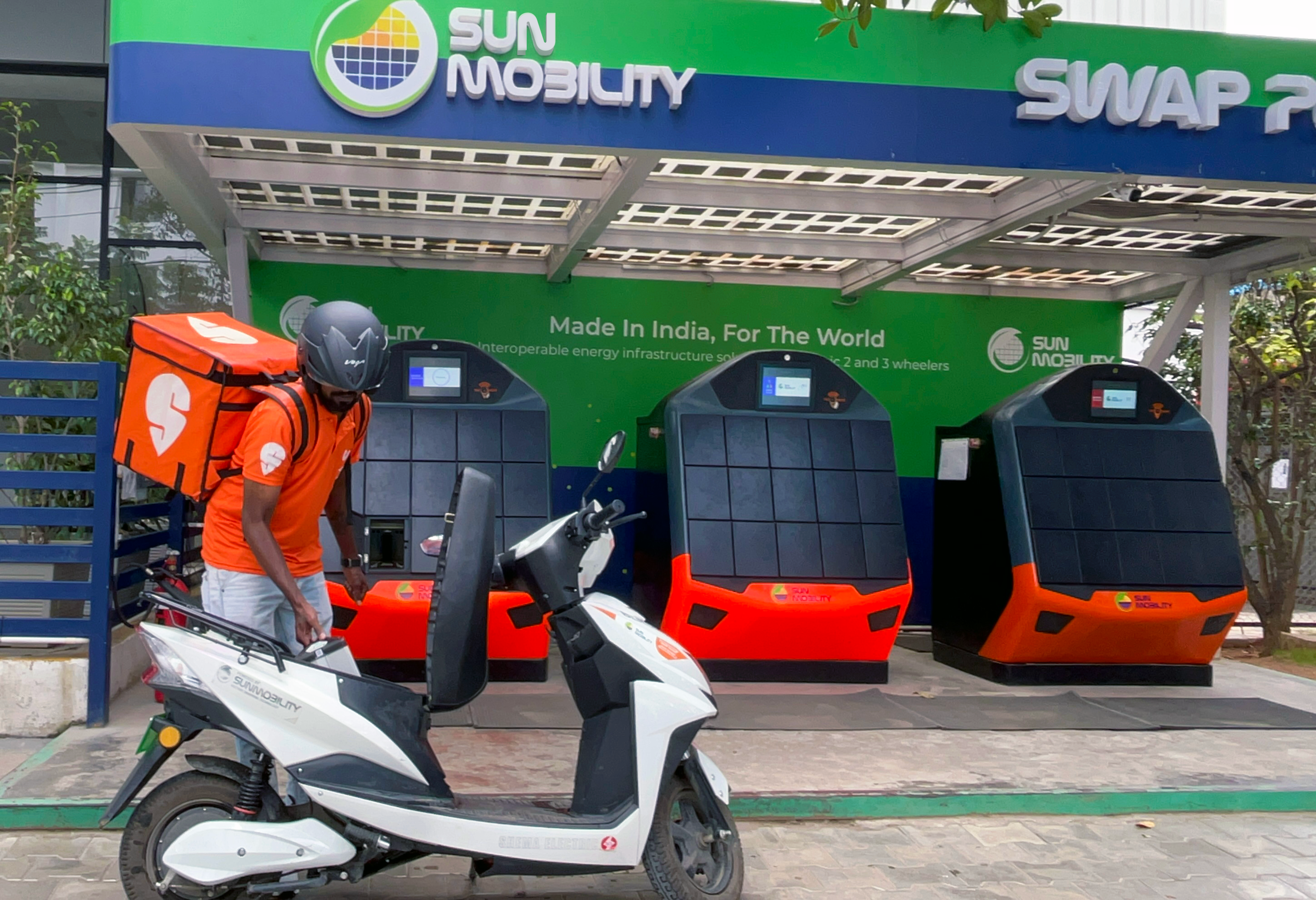
A Swiggy delivery rider swapping a battery at a Swap Point

SUN Mobility has partnered with fleet operators (such as Amazon, Zomato, Swiggy), shared mobility service providers, and automotive OEMs(such as Omega Seiki Mobility, Hero Electric, Piaggio Vehicles Pvt. Ltd., and a few others) across vehicle platforms including two-wheelers, three-wheelers, and four-wheelers to bring battery swapping to a wider user base across India.

In collaboration with prominent energy infrastructure players, electricity distribution companies, and city transport corporations such as Indian Oil Corporation, Delhi Metro Rail Corporation, Tata Power Delhi Distribution Limited, etc., the company has been working on expanding their network across urban India.
