= Uday Khemka =

Indian investor

- Born: India
- Education: Harvard Business School
- Occupations: CEO, Entrepreneur

Uday Khemka is an Indian investor, entrepreneur, and philanthropist. He has contributed to the climate change sector in India and his work with SUN Group. He has collaborated with Bill Clinton, Narendra Modi, and other political figures in the field of climate change.
