= LATC =

LATC may refer to:

- Los Altos Town Crier, a newspaper in Los Altos, California, US
- Los Angeles Theatre Center, a theatre complex in Downtown Los Angeles, US
- Los Angeles Tennis Club
- Tata Light Armored Troop Carrier
