= Tata Light Armored Troop Carrier =

Armored troop carrier produced in India

TATA Light Armored Troop Carrier
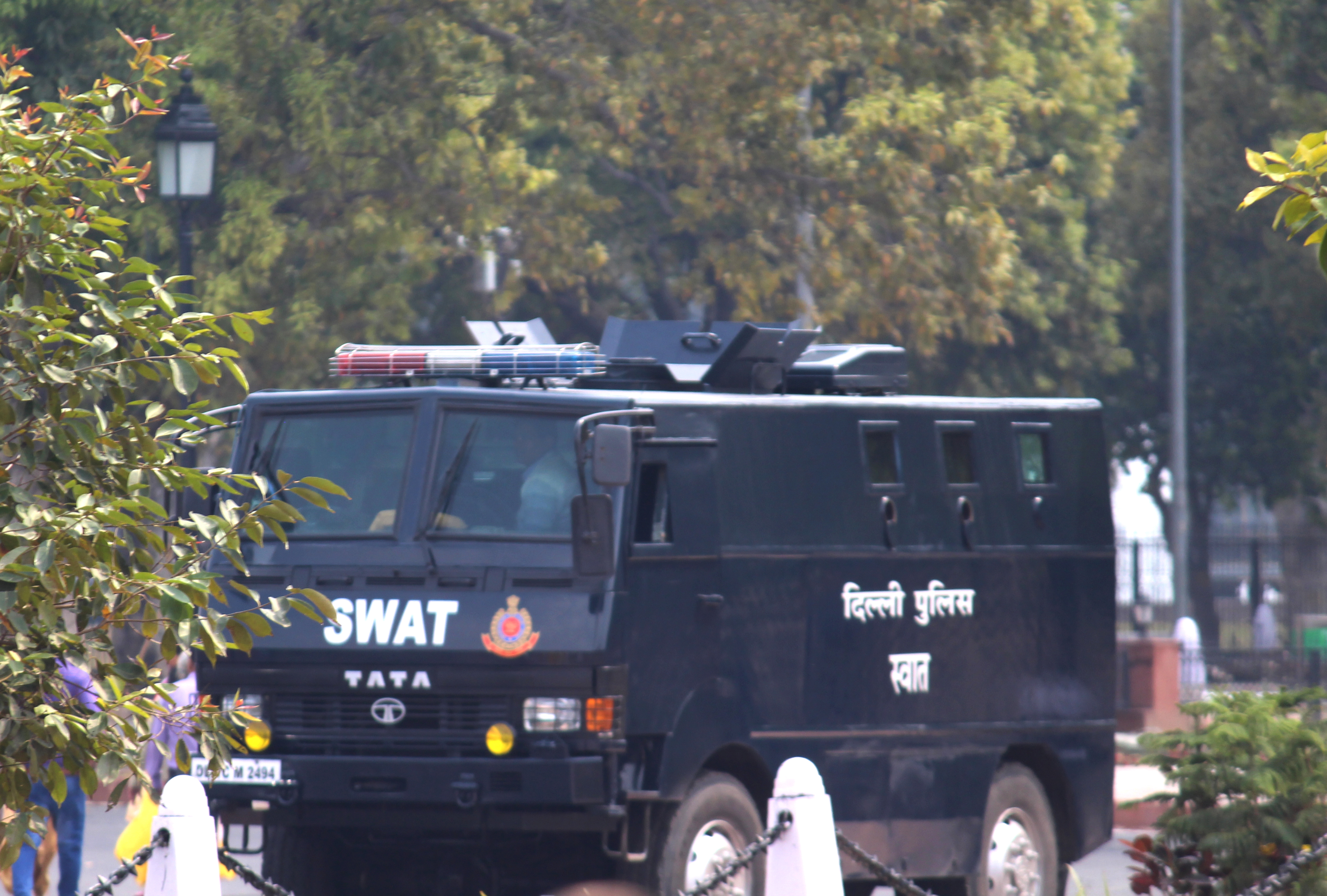

Overview
- Manufacturer: Tata Advanced Systems
- Production: 2008- 2016
- Assembly: India: Pune (Tata defense manufacturing facility)

Powertrain
- Engine: HA6ET13UN-BSIII 135KW@2400rpm, 670Nm@1300-1600 rpm, 160 Ltrs
- Transmission: 6 SPEED SYNCHROMESH (6F + 1R)
- Hybrid drivetrain: Mild Hybrid (Since 2021)

The Tata Light Armored Troop Carrier (LATC) is an armored personnel carrier developed by Tata Motors, an automotive company located in India. It is designed to meet the operational requirements of the Indian Armed Forces and paramilitary units, providing protection, mobility, and versatility for various operations.

The Tata LATC is a multi-role armored vehicle developed to enhance India's self-reliance in defense manufacturing. It incorporates features suitable for military and paramilitary applications.

== Launch ==
The Tata LATC was introduced as part of Tata Motors' initiative to contribute to the defense sector. The Tata Light Armored Troop Carrier (LATC) was first showcased in 2008 at the Defexpo India, an exhibition dedicated to land, naval, and internal security systems. This event marked its introduction to the defense sector, highlighting Tata Motors' commitment to providing armored solutions for military and paramilitary applications.

The LATC was developed to meet the operational requirements of armed forces and paramilitary units, offering protection, mobility, and versatility for various operations. Its design includes features such as ballistic protection against small arms fire and improvised explosive devices (IEDs), off-road capabilities, and the capacity to transport up to 12 personnel.

== Design and Features ==
The Tata LATC includes the following features:

- Armor protection: The vehicle provides ballistic protection against small arms fire, shrapnel, and improvised explosive devices (IEDs). It meets STANAG Level 1 or higher standards for armored vehicles.
  - Top: Withstand direct hits of 5.56 mm INSAS, and 7.62 mm AK 47/56 rifles at a distance of 10 m at an angle of 45 degrees.
  - All Sides: Withstand direct hits of 5.56 INSAS and 7.62 mm AK 47/56 at a distance of 10 m at an angle of 90 degrees.
  - Floor protection from two hand grenades ( 50 grams of TNT ).
- Mobility: Equipped with a high-performance engine, the LATC offers off-road capabilities for operations in rugged terrains.
- Capacity: The vehicle is designed to transport up to 12 personnel, including the driver and commander.
- Weapon mounts: It can be equipped with a roof-mounted machine gun or other weapon systems.
- Customization: Configurable for various roles, including troop transport, reconnaissance, and command-and-control operations.
- RCWS: Remote controlled weapon station is designed for movement of troops in counter insurgency operation.
- Air conditioning and run-flat tyres.

== Technical Specifications ==
Feature	Specification
Dimensions	L - 7,885 mm, W - 2,545 mm, H - 3,360 mm
Armouring	CEN Level BR6
Transmission	6 SPEED SYNCHROMESH (6F + 1R)
Wheels/ Tyres	355/90 R 20
Brakes	Graduates Hand Control Valve Operated, Spring Brake
Axle Type	Front and Rear: Fully Floating, Single Speed Hypoid Drive, Capacity 7500 kg
Suspension	Front and Rear: Semi-Electric Multi Leaf, Double Action Telescopic
Range	Approximately 600 km
Payload Capacity	Up to 2,000 kg
Armor Level	STANAG Level 1+
Seating Capacity	10-12 personnel

== Applications ==
The Tata LATC is deployed for a variety of missions, including:

- Internal Security: Counter-insurgency and anti-terrorism operations.
- Border Patrol: Ensuring the safety of borders in challenging terrains.
- Peacekeeping Missions: Potential deployment in international peacekeeping roles.
- Disaster Response: Supporting mobility and protection in disaster-affected areas.

== Production ==
The LATC is manufactured at Tata Motors’ defense manufacturing facility in Pune, India. The production process follows stringent quality standards to ensure durability and performance in various environments. The tender was passed to JCBL Armouring Solutions to provide the latest and most hi-tech versions of this Light Armored Troop Carrier through its in-house research and development wing. JCBL is a Government approved and IATF16949 certified in-house manufacturing facility.

== Indigenous Use ==
The LATC has been presented at international defense exhibitions as a potential solution for armored vehicle requirements worldwide. This vehicle is certified for use by state police and paramilitary forces. It has ballistic and blast protection, and can seat a driver, commander, and 12 crew members. The Tata LATC SWAT carrier is one of the vehicles used by the Delhi Police. In 2013, Tata Motors delivered over 150 Tata Light armored Troop Carriers (LATC) to Central Reserve Police Force (CRPF) and Gujarat State Police. In 2011, Chandigarh Police bought TATA special anti-terror armored vehicle LATC at cost of 57 lakh rupees. The state police named the vehicle as 'Kavach' (Sanskrit word for armour). The LATC would be used during the visits of VVIP's and other high-profile dignitaries as the vehicle will be part of their cavalcades. It can be also later stationed outside the hotels where the VVIP's stay.
