= DRDO Muntra =

Muntra (Unarmed Vehicle)
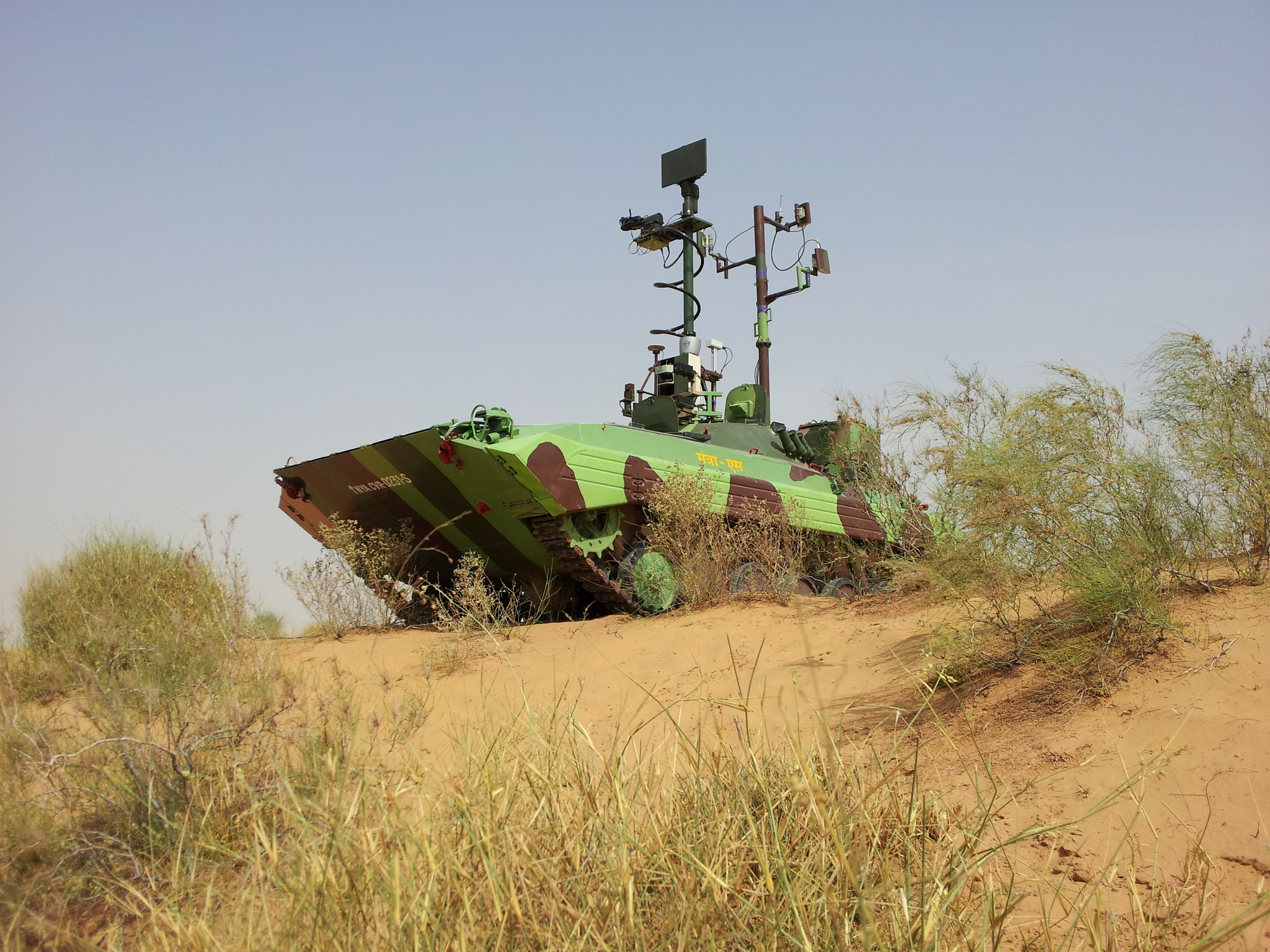
- Muntra-S
- Type: Unmanned vehicle
- Place of origin: India

Service history
- In service: 2017–present

Production history
- Designer: Defence Research and Development Organisation
- Manufacturer: Ordnance Factory
- Variants: MUNTRA-S

Specifications
- Mass: 11 tonnes (12 short tons; 11 long tons)
- Length: 6.735 metres (22 ft 1.2 in)
- Width: 3.15 metres (10 ft 4 in)
- Height: 2.45 metres (8 ft 0 in)
- Engine: 300 hp (225 kW)
- Power/weight: 21 hp/tonne

Muntra is a family of unmanned armored vehicle developed by India's Defence Research and Development Organisation. The name stands for "Mission Unmanned Tracked".

== Design ==
Muntra is a family modified Soviet BMP-2 armored personnel carrier intended to be used for unmanned missions. Current variants are unarmed. Three variants exist: Muntra-S for surveillance, Muntra-M for mine clearing, and Muntra-N operating in nuclear or chemical contaminated zones. It has autonomous navigation through GPS waypoints with obstacle detection and avoidance.

== Variants ==
Muntra-B

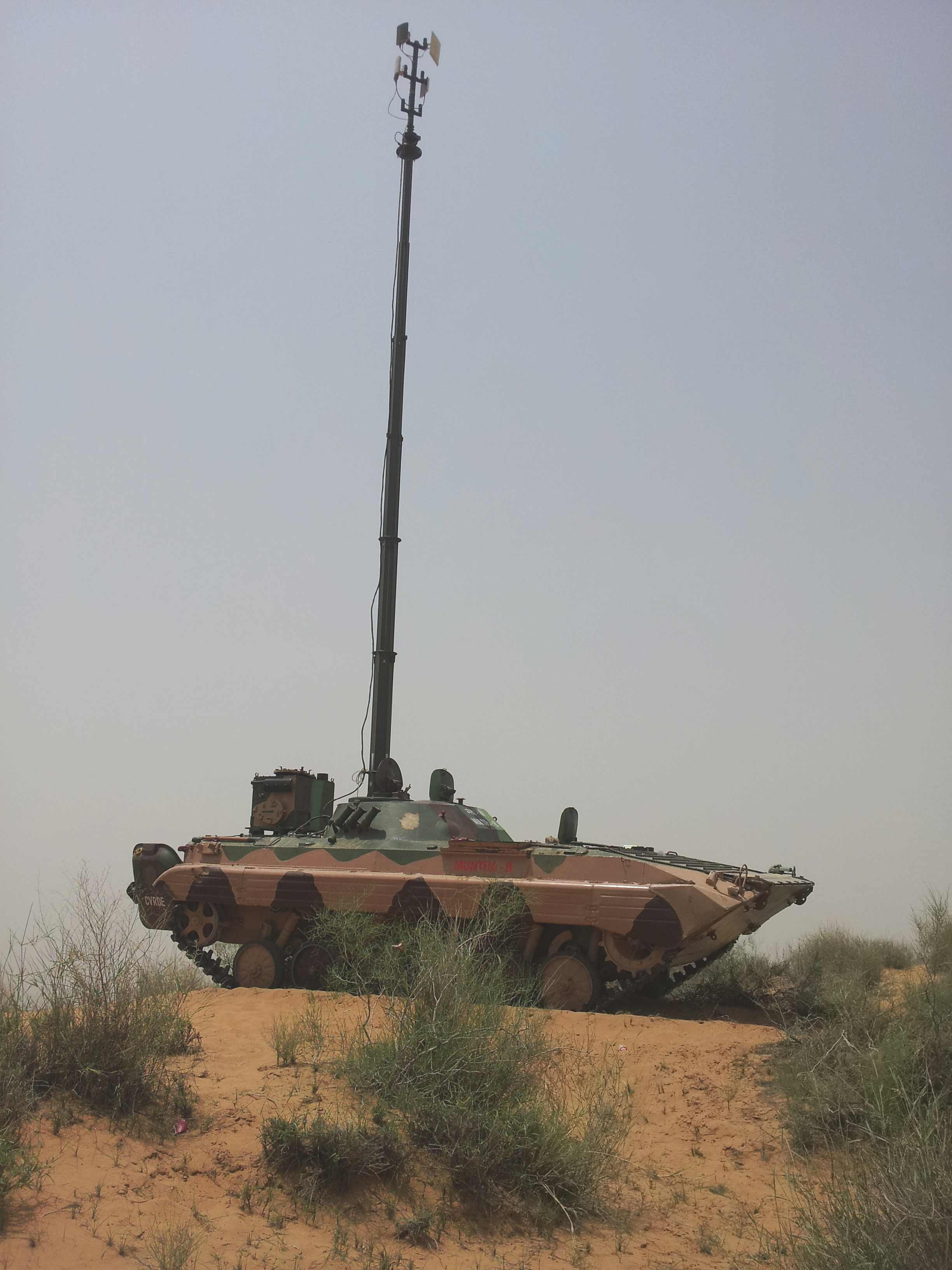
MUNTRA-B

It is the command post for the MUNTRA series of vehicles. It has a 2-man crew to command the MUNTRA series of vehicles via a datalink.

MUNTRA-S

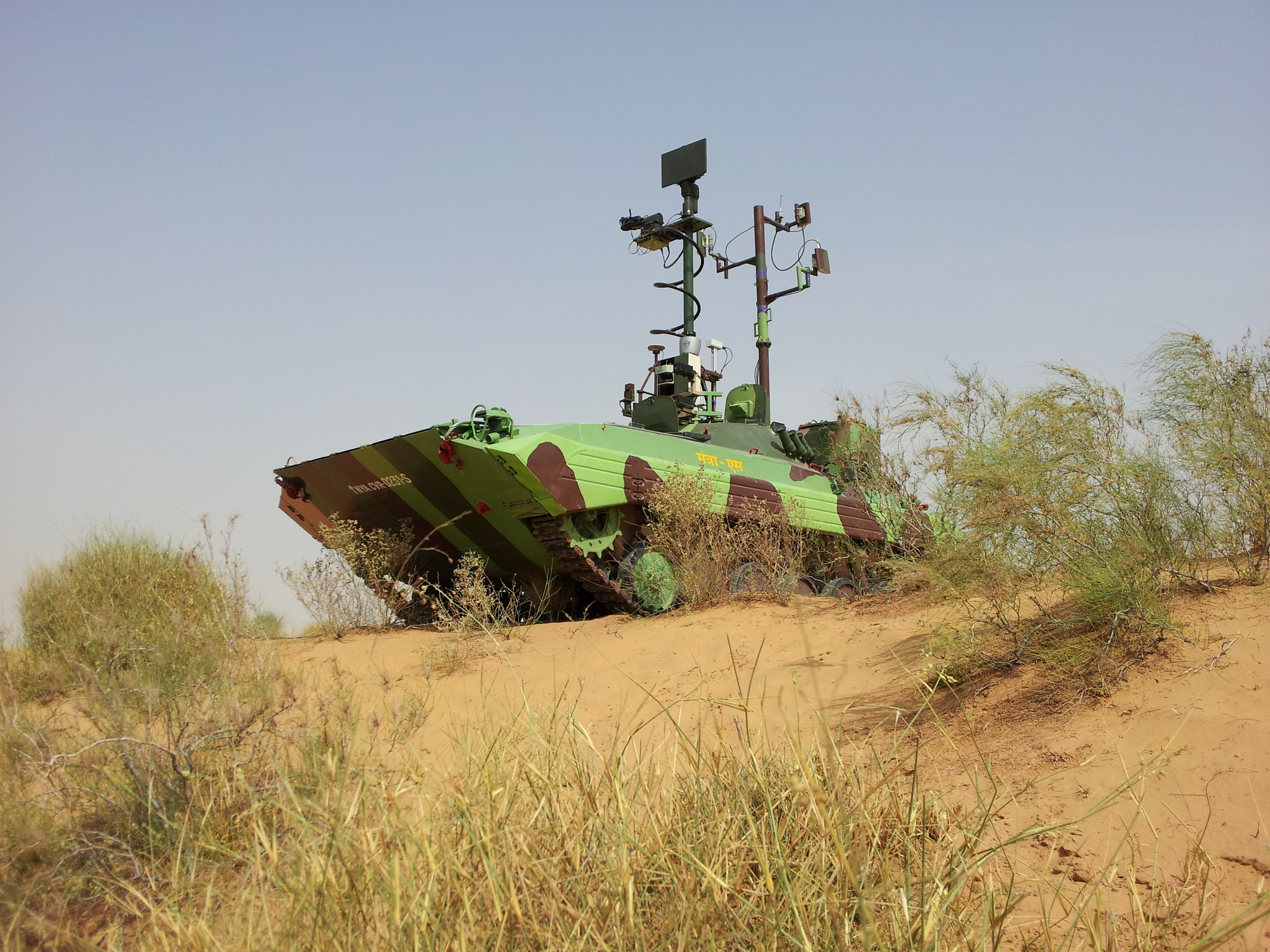
Muntra-S

MUNTRA-S is tele-operated from MUNTRA-B via a datalink or through pre set waypoints. It has a maximum detection range of 15 Kilometres.

MUNTRA-M

The Muntra-M is equipped with ground Penetrating Radar (GPR) and Vapour Detection System (VDS) to detect landmines and IED'S and marks the area.

MUNTRA-N

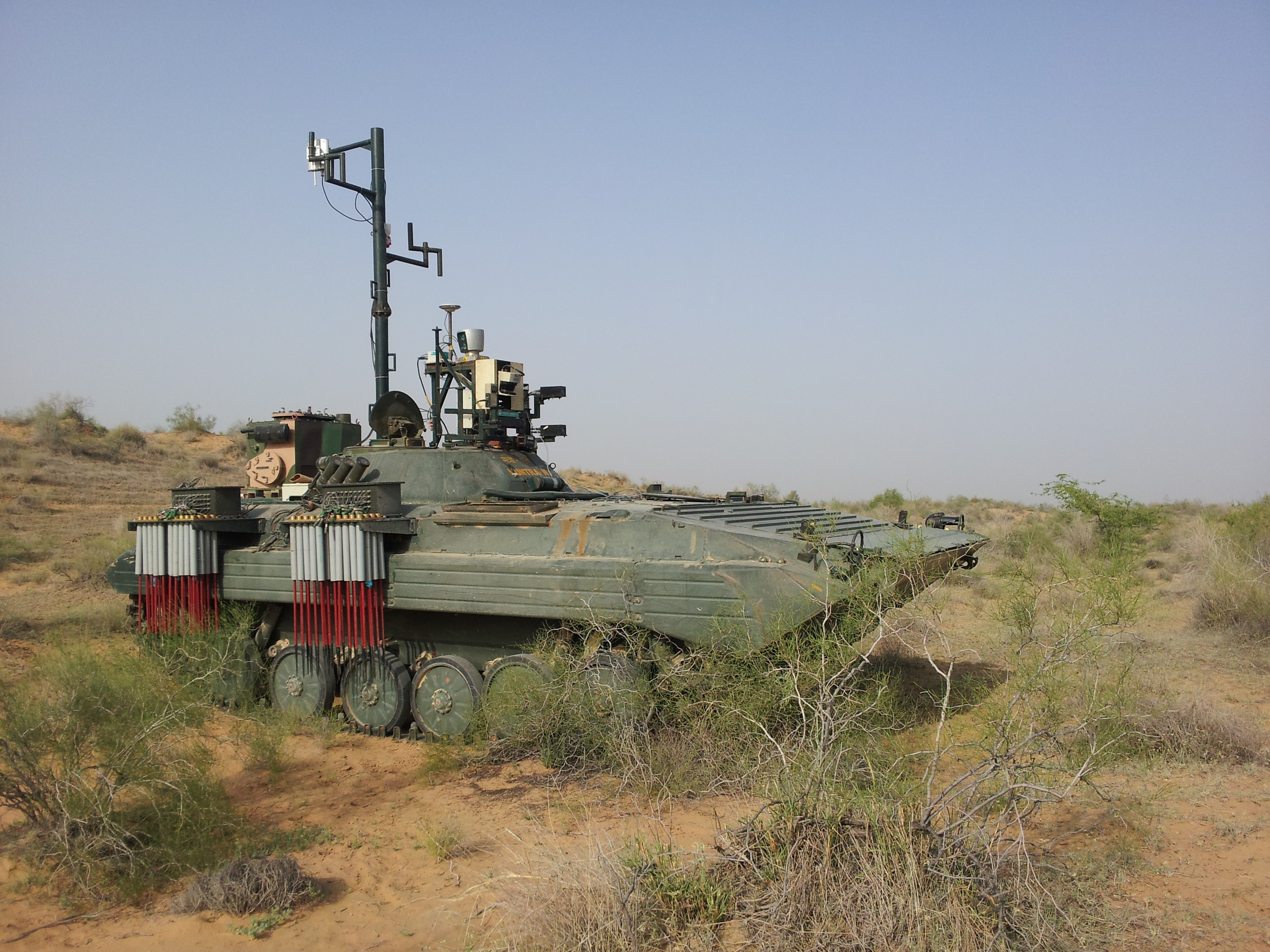
MUNTRA-N

The MUNTRA-N is intended to operate in Nuclear and biological affected combat environments to carry out survey and recon of the affected area.It is capable of detecting nuclear radiations, chemical warfare agents, biological agents like Viruses and Bacteria etc. and can collect samples from the affected areas.

== See also ==
- DRDO Daksh
- Unmanned ground vehicle
- DRDO Rustom
- HAL CATS Warrior
- HAL Combat Air Teaming System
