= Defence Exhibition Organisation =

Autonomous organisation of the Indian Government

- Emblem of India

Agency overview
- Formed: 1981; 45 years ago
- Jurisdiction: Government of India
- Headquarters: Defence Pavilion, Pragati Maidan, New Delhi
- Parent department: Ministry of Defence
- Website: www.ddpmod.gov.in/en/ministry/our-organisations/defence_exhibition_organisation_deo

Defence Exhibition Organisation is an autonomous organisation of the Indian Government established in 1981. The organisation's main charter is to organise and coordinate Aerospace and Defence (A&D) exhibitions in India and aboard. The agency is responsible for organising international exhibitions such as DefExpo and Indian participation at overseas exhibitions such as Aero India and DefExpo. The DEO is also involved in coordinating and the setting-up of "India Pavilion" at major international Aerospace & Defence exhibitions abroad in order to improve the export potential of the Indian Aerospace & Defence Industry.

== DefExpo ==
DefExpo is India's flagship biennial event showcasing Land, Naval and Homeland Security Systems, first launched in 1999.

DefExpo2020 was held in Lucknow, Uttar Pradesh from February 5 to 8, 2020. This is for the first time the defence exhibition is being held in the northern state to explore potential available for defence productions. MoD has already announced Uttar Pradesh Defence Corridor to attract investments in defence manufacturing.

DefExpo2022 was held in Gandhinagar, Gujarat from October 18 to October 22, 2022. An investor outreach event 'Invest for Defence' was organised bringing together businesses and investors, with a focus on indigenisation and self reliance in the Indian defence industry, for the first time in the history of the expo.

== See also ==
- Make In India
- Startup India
