= Ordnance Factory Medak =

Indian defence production company

Ordnance Factory Medak (OFMK) (formerly)
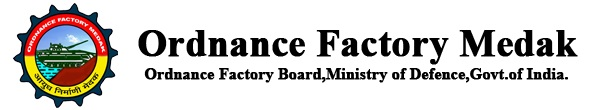
- Type: part of Armoured Vehicles Nigam
- Industry: Defence
- Founded: 1984; 42 years ago Medak, India
- Key people: Alok Prasad, IOFS (General Manager)
- Products: Armoured fighting vehicles
- Number of employees: ~3,000
- Website: www.ofmedak.gov.in

Ordnance Factory Medak (OFMK) (Hindi: आयुध निर्माणी मेदक), previously called Ordnance Factory Project Medak (OFPM) while in its development stage, is a factory owned by Armoured Vehicles Nigam Limited, a company that manufactures armoured vehicles and was one of the 41 Indian ordnance factories under the erstwhile Ordnance Factories Board of the Ministry of Defence, controlled by Government of India.

== History ==
It was established on 19 July 1984 by the then prime minister of India, Indira Gandhi for the indigenous production of Infantry Combat Vehicles.

== Products ==
Over the decades, the company has diversified its product range, manufacturing surface-to-air missile (SAM) launchers, surface-to-surface missile launchers, armoured ambulances, self-propelled howitzers, armoured cars, unmanned ground vehicles (UGVs), armoured light recovery vehicles, NBC recce vehicles, mine protected vehicles, armoured amphibious dozers, armoured radars, naval armaments, etc.

- BMP-2 Sarath (Chariot of Victory)– Indian license-produced variant of the BMP-2, built by Ordnance Factory Medak. The first vehicle, assembled from components supplied by KBP, was ready in 1987. By 1999, about 90% of the complete vehicle and its associated systems were being produced in India. It is estimated that by 2007, 1,250 vehicles had been built. India has also developed the following versions of the Sarath:
  - BMP-2K Sarath – Command vehicle, similar to the Soviet/Russian version.
  - Armoured Ambulance – This version retains the turret but without the gun or smoke grenade launchers. The troop compartment has been modified to carry four stretchers.
  - Armoured Amphibious Dozer (AAD) – Turret-less combat engineer vehicle, fitted with a folding dozer blade at the rear, mine ploughs, a main winch with a capacity of 8,000 kg and a rocket-propelled earth anchor for self-recovery.
  - Armoured Vehicle Tracked Light Repair – Armoured recovery vehicle, fitted with a light hydraulic crane.
  - Armoured Engineer Reconnaissance Vehicle (AERV) – This version has no gun and is fitted with specialised equipment, including an echo-sounder, a water current meter, a laser range finder and GPS. On the left rear of the hull, a marking system with 40 rods is fitted.
  - NBC Reconnaissance Vehicle (NBCRV) – For detection of nuclear, biological and chemical contamination. The NBCRV was developed by DRDO and VRDE. It has been ordered by the Indian army.
  - BMP-2 UGV – unmanned-reconnaissance ground vehicle fitted with equipment used to detect nuclear, biological and chemical contamination as well as mines. It is the remotely controllable variant of NBCRV.
  - Carrier Mortar Tracked Vehicle (CMT) – This turret-less version has an 81 mm mortar mounted in the modified troop compartment. The mortar is fired through an opening in the hull roof that has two hinged doors. It has a max. range of 5,000 m and a normal rate of fire of 6–8 rds/min. There is also a long range version of the mortar. The vehicle carries 108 mortar rounds and is also fitted with a 7.62 mm machine gun with 2,350 rounds. Crew: 2+4. The first prototype was completed in 1997.
  - NAMICA (Nag Missile Carrier) – part of the Nag anti-tank missile system. The Nag (Cobra) missile is launched from a retractable armoured launcher that contains four launch tubes and the guidance package. Nag is a fire-and-forget top-attack ATGM with a tandem-HEAT warhead and a range of at least 4 km.
  - Akash Missile Launcher – Air-defence missile system that is based on a modified Sarath chassis with 7 road wheels. On top of the hull there's a launcher for three SAM's with a range of 27 km and semi-active homing guidance.
  - Trishul Missile Launcher - The chassis of the Sarath has been modified to launch the Trishul SAM, with three missiles being carried in the ready to launch position, search and track radars and their associated fire-control system. In addition, there is a mobile command post with a raised superstructure, which is the nerve centre of the missiles' command, control, communications and intelligence functions. This system has yet to enter quantity production.
  - Rajendra RADAR – This is a multifunctional 3-D phased radar (MUFAR), associated with the Akash system. It is also based on the stretched chassis.
  - 105mm Self-Propelled Gun – This is OFB's mechanized version of the Indian Light Field Gun (EQPT 105/37 LFG E2) with 42 rounds stowed. The gun is mounted in a lightly armoured turret. The 105mm SPG was shown for the first time in public in February 2010 during DEFEXPO-2010 in New Delhi and is planned to replace the FV433 Abbot SPG in the Indian army.
- Mine Protected Vehicle – Also manufactured at Vehicle Factory Jabalpur.
- Bullet-Proof Vehicles - Bullet-proofing of Gypsy, Ambassador, 407, Safari and Prado.
- Medak Gun
- CRN 91 Naval Gun
Present Products and their variants
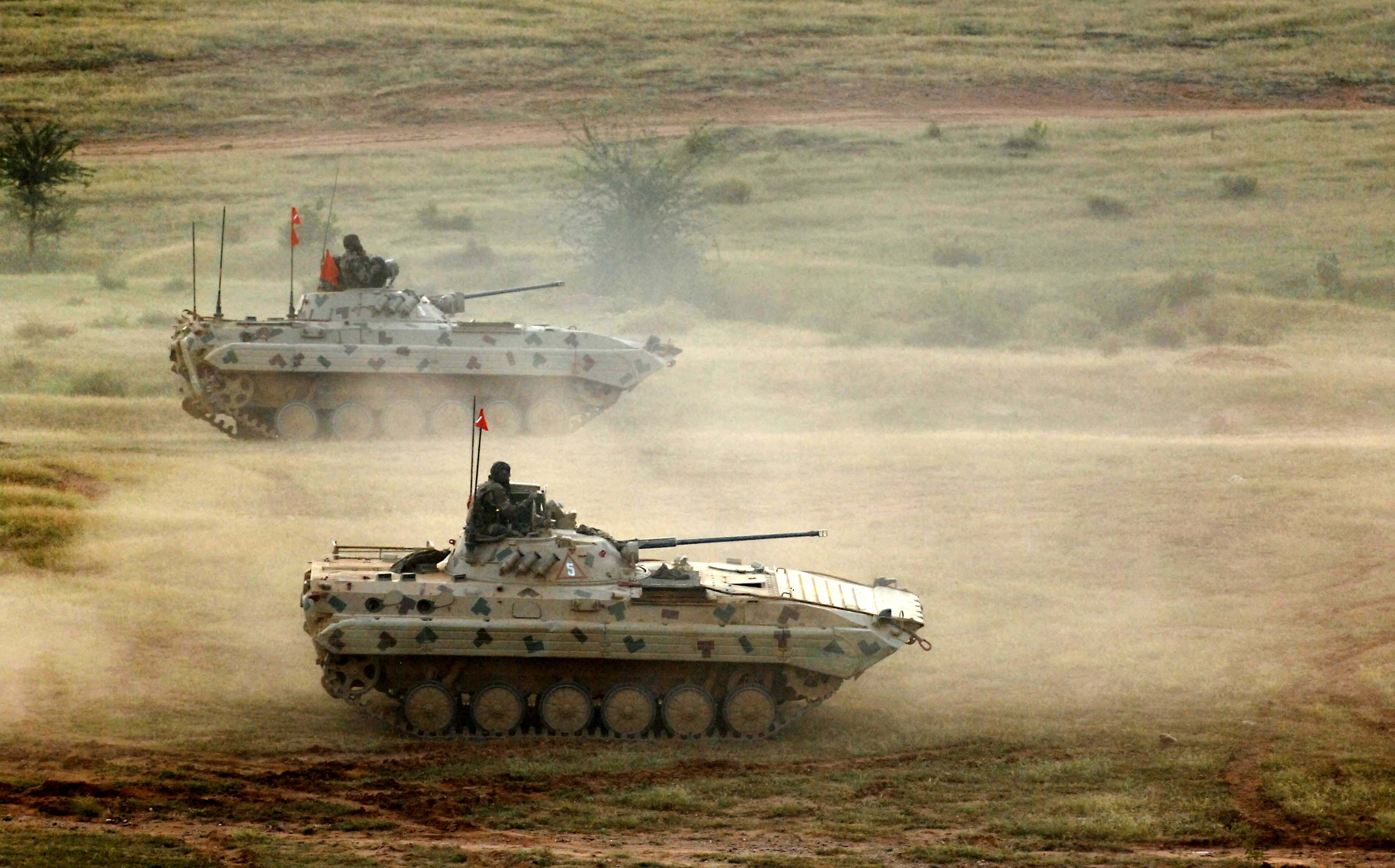
Sarath Infantry Combat Vehicle (ICV)

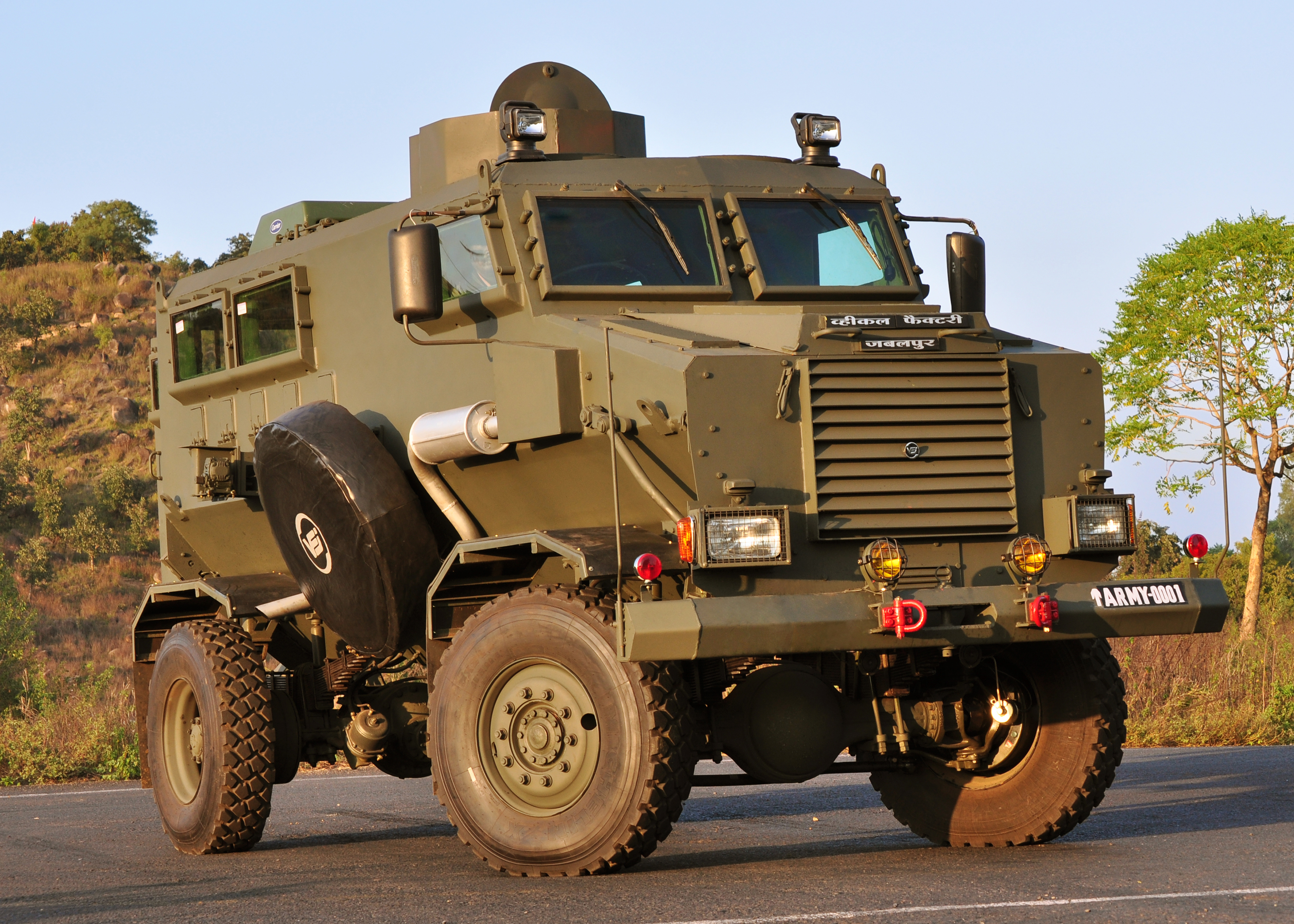
4X4 Mine Protected Vehicle, also in 6X6 configuration, with RCWS, recce and recovery variants

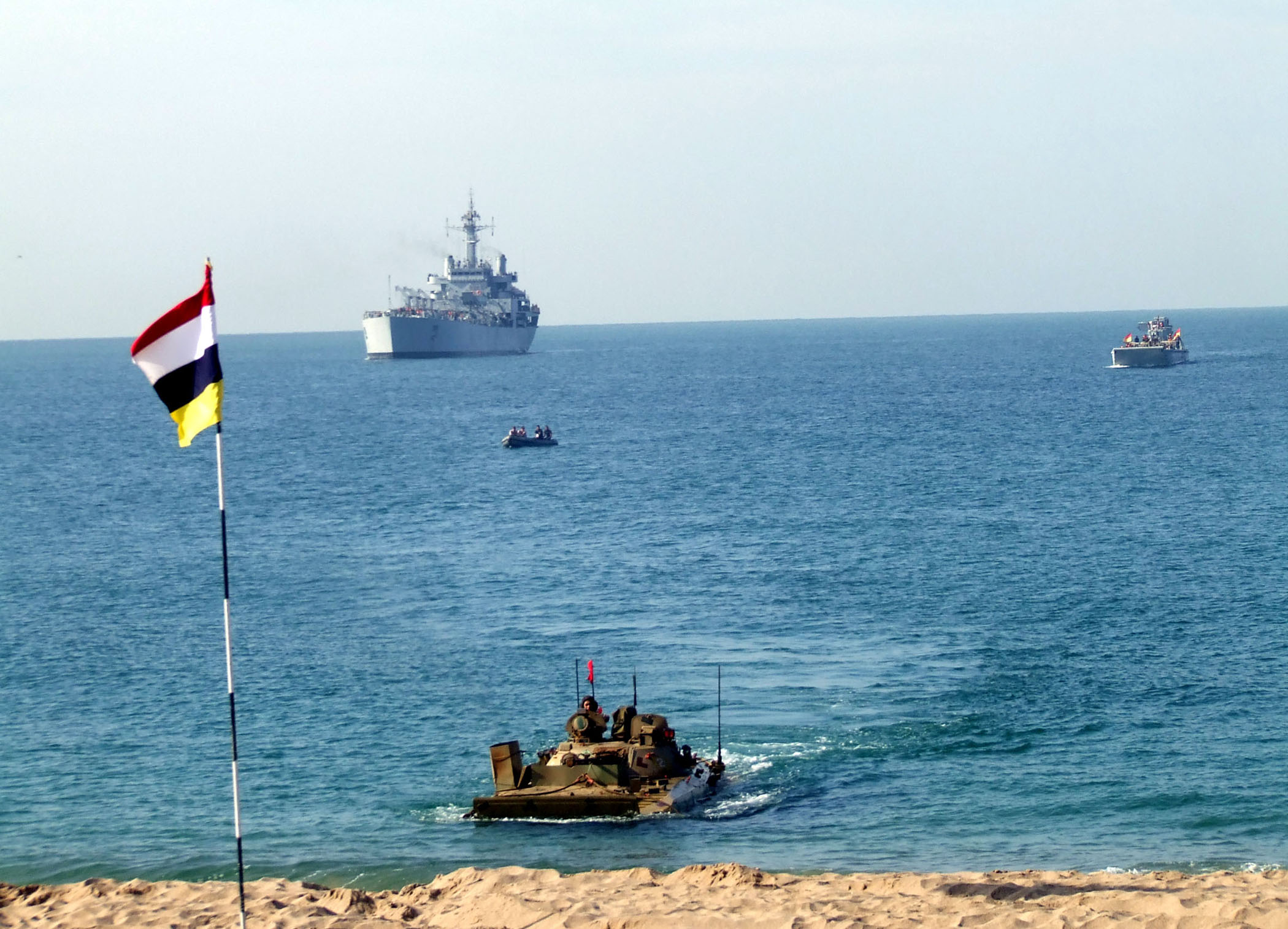
Sarath in amphibious role travelling through sea

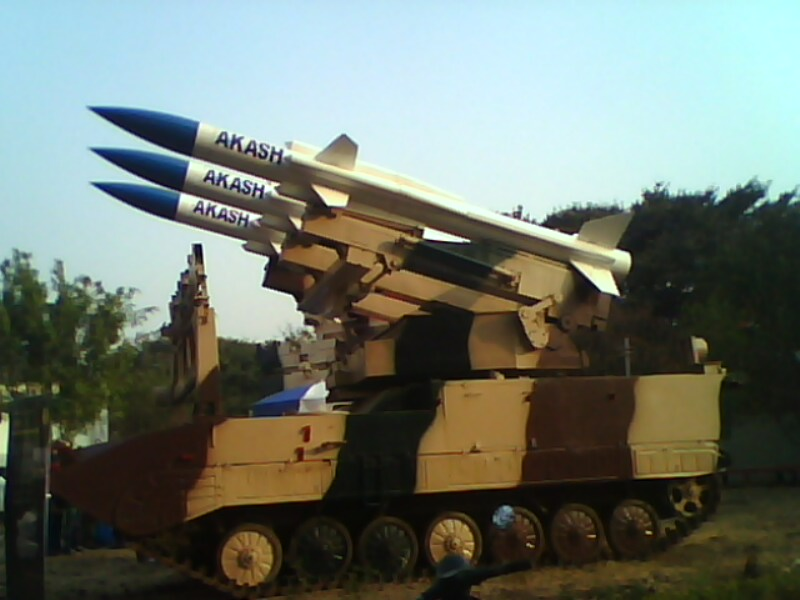
Akash Missile Launcher on Sarath

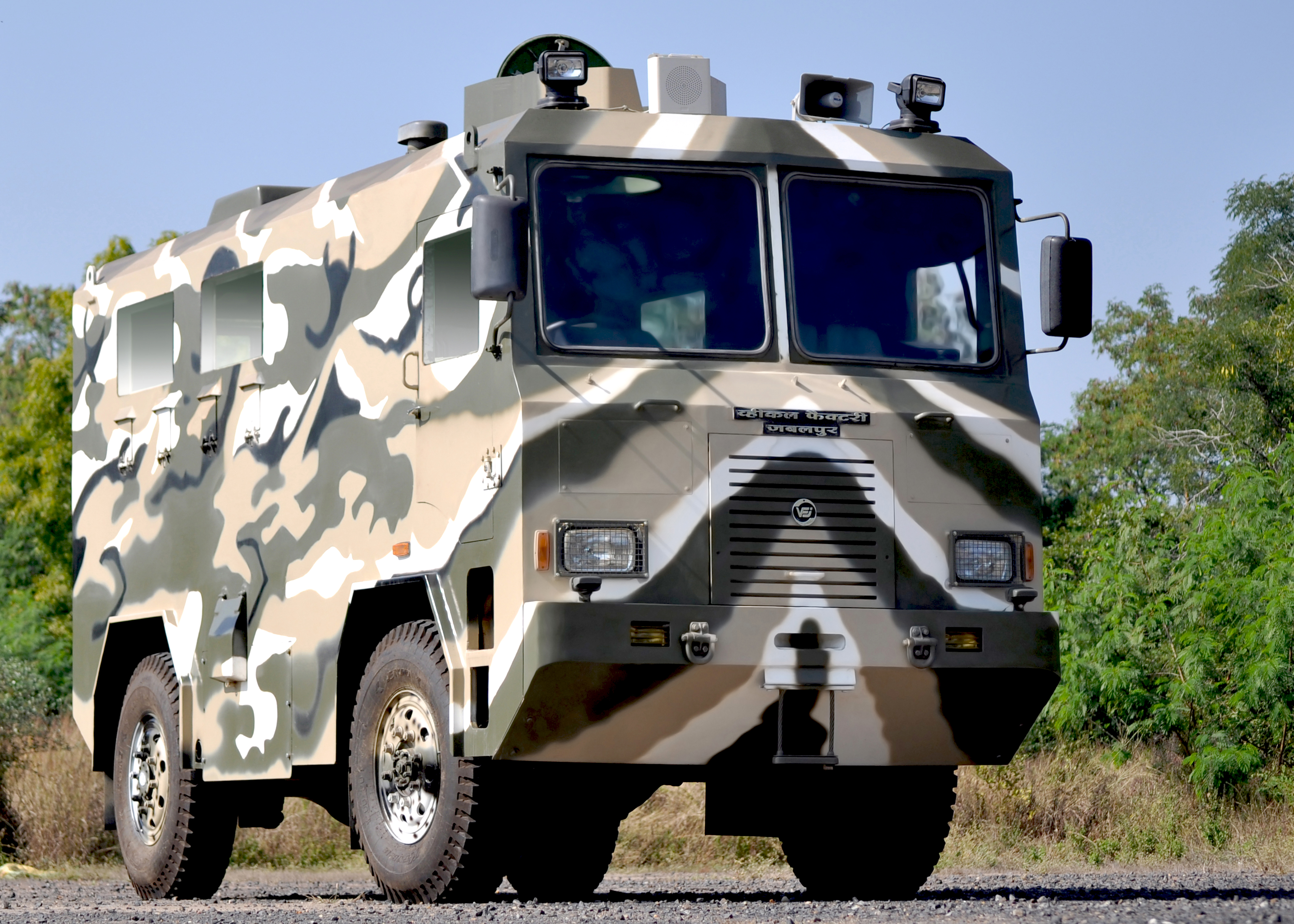
4X4 Bullet Proof Vehicle

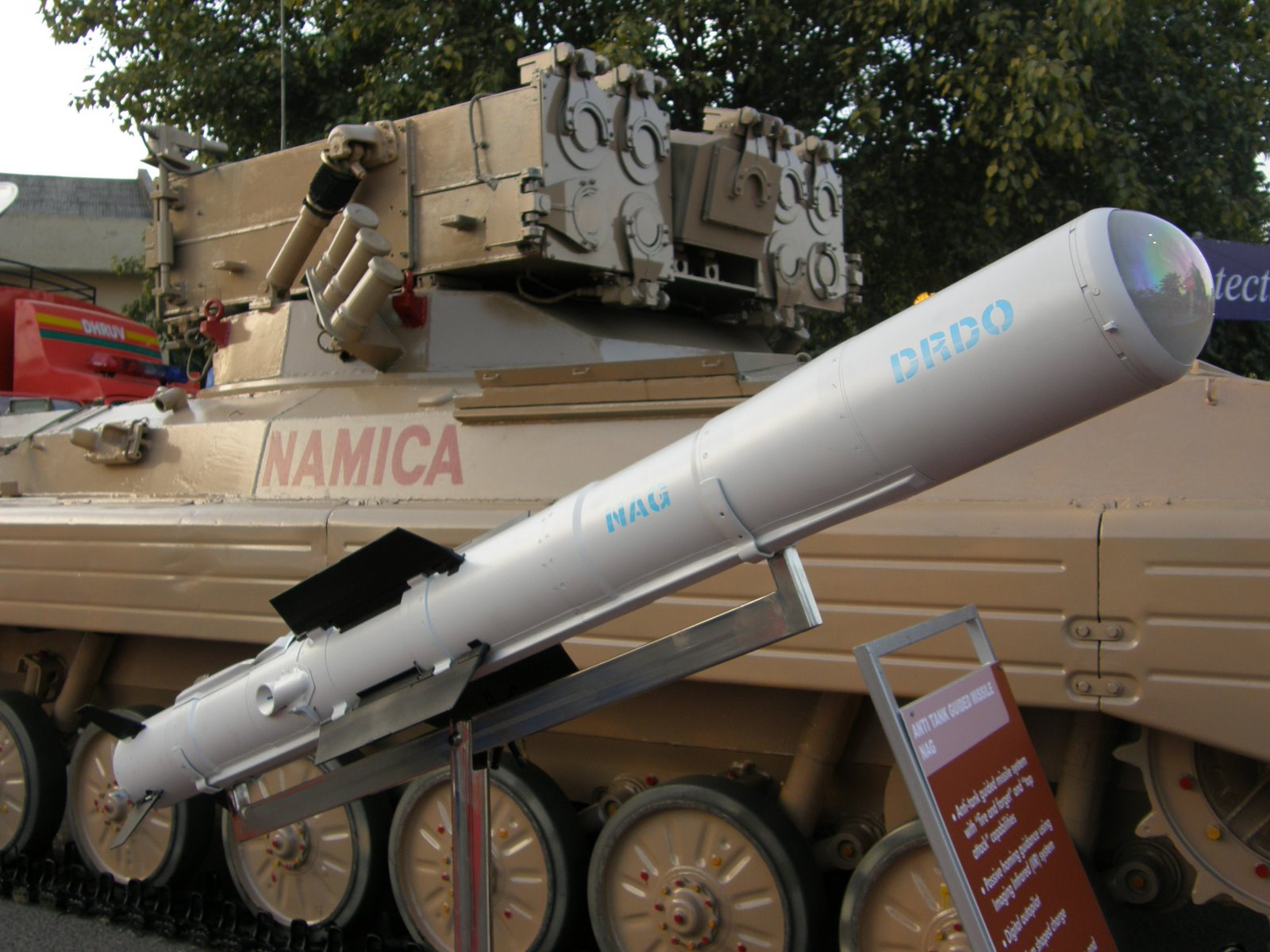
Nag Missile Carrier (Namica)

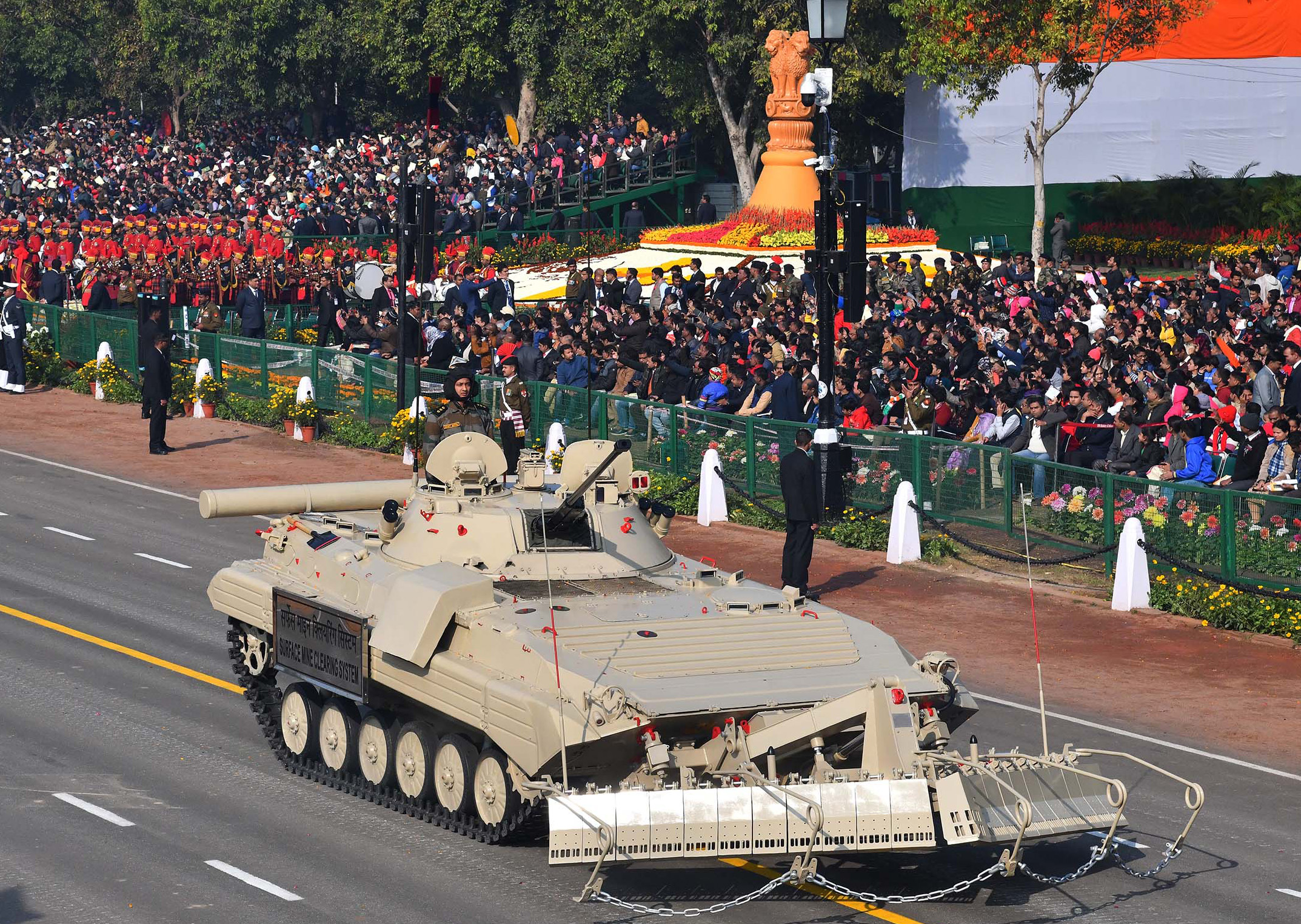
Surface Mine Clearing System on Sarath

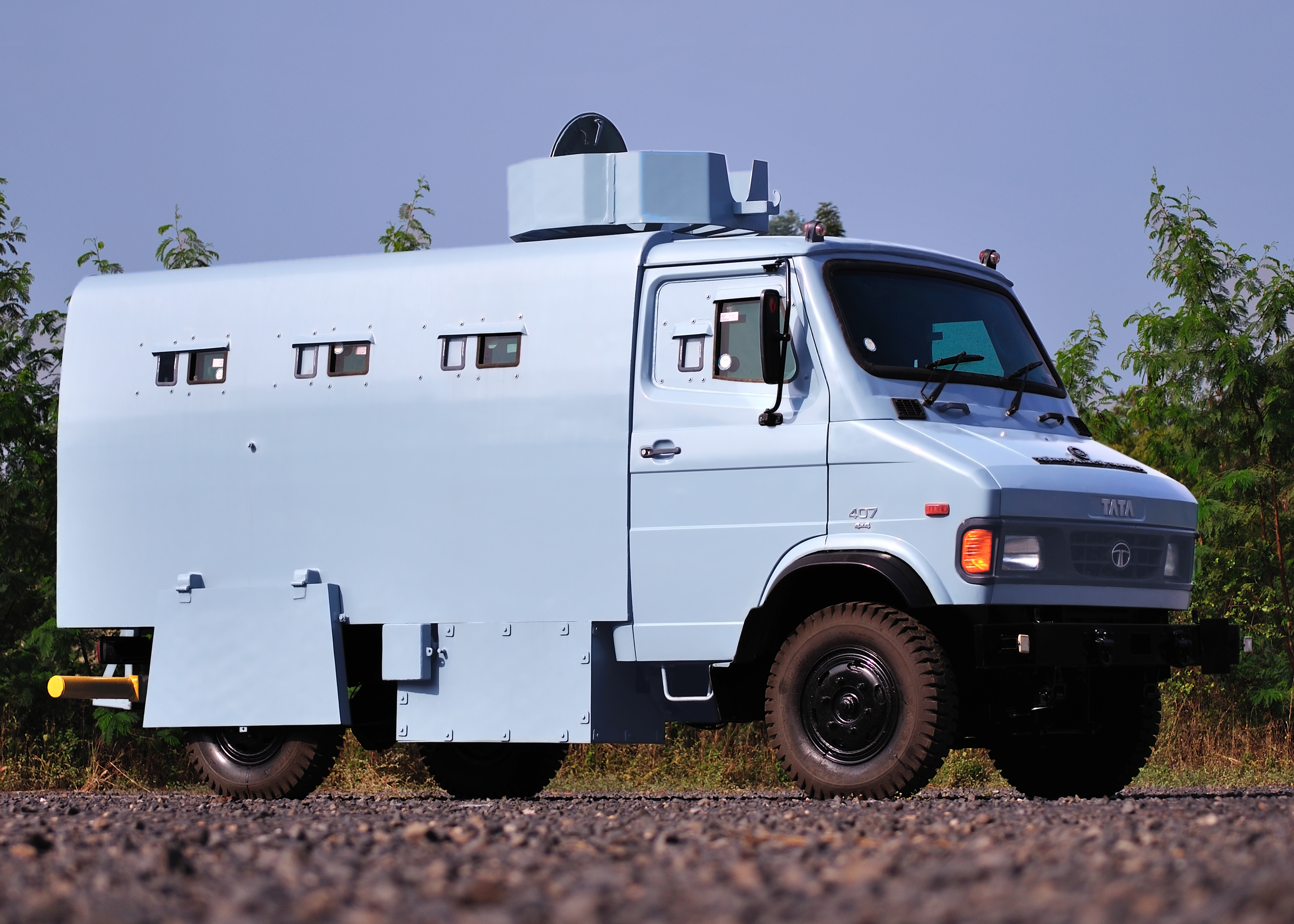
4X4 Riot Control Vehicle

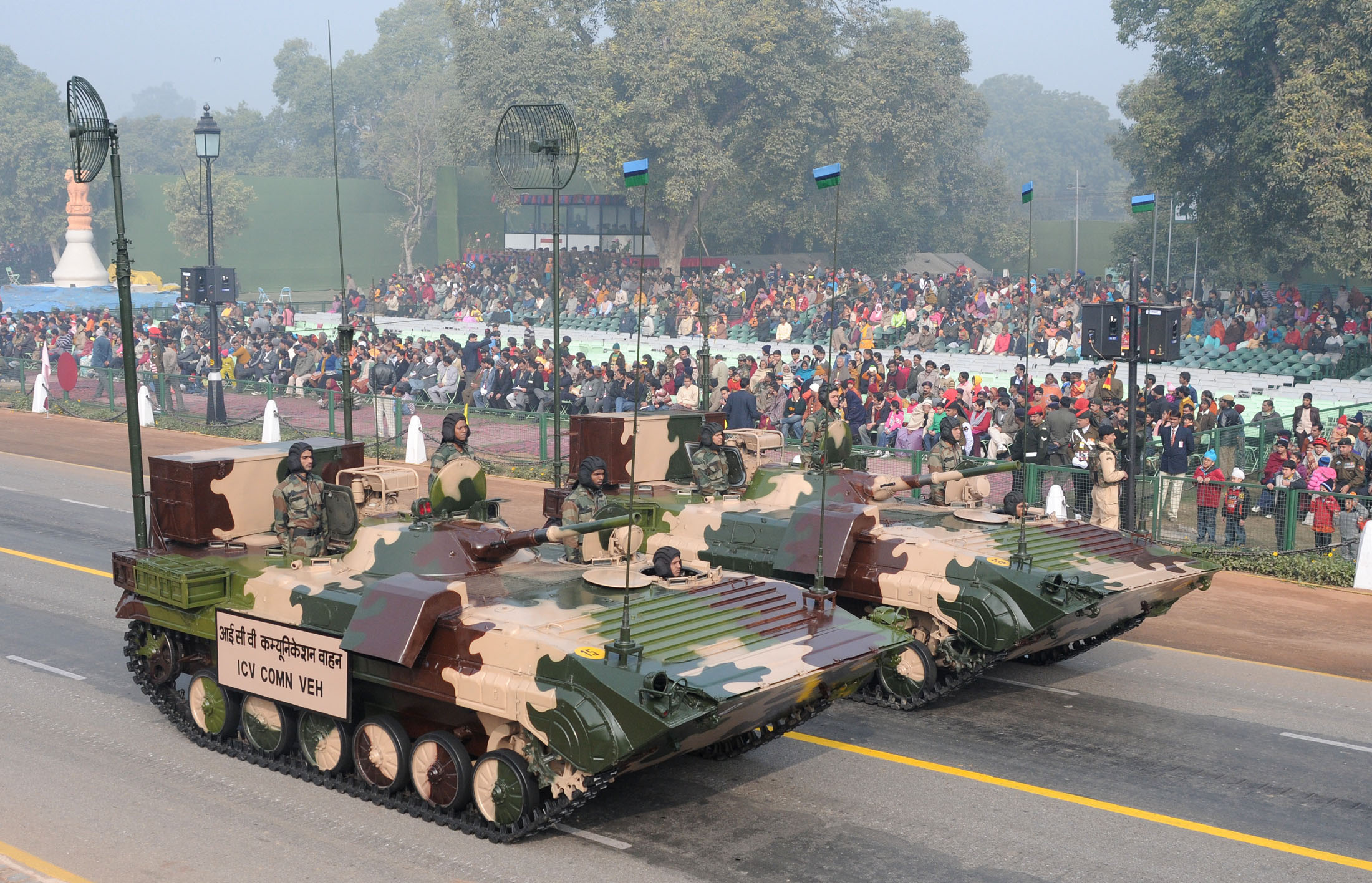
ICV Communication Vehicle

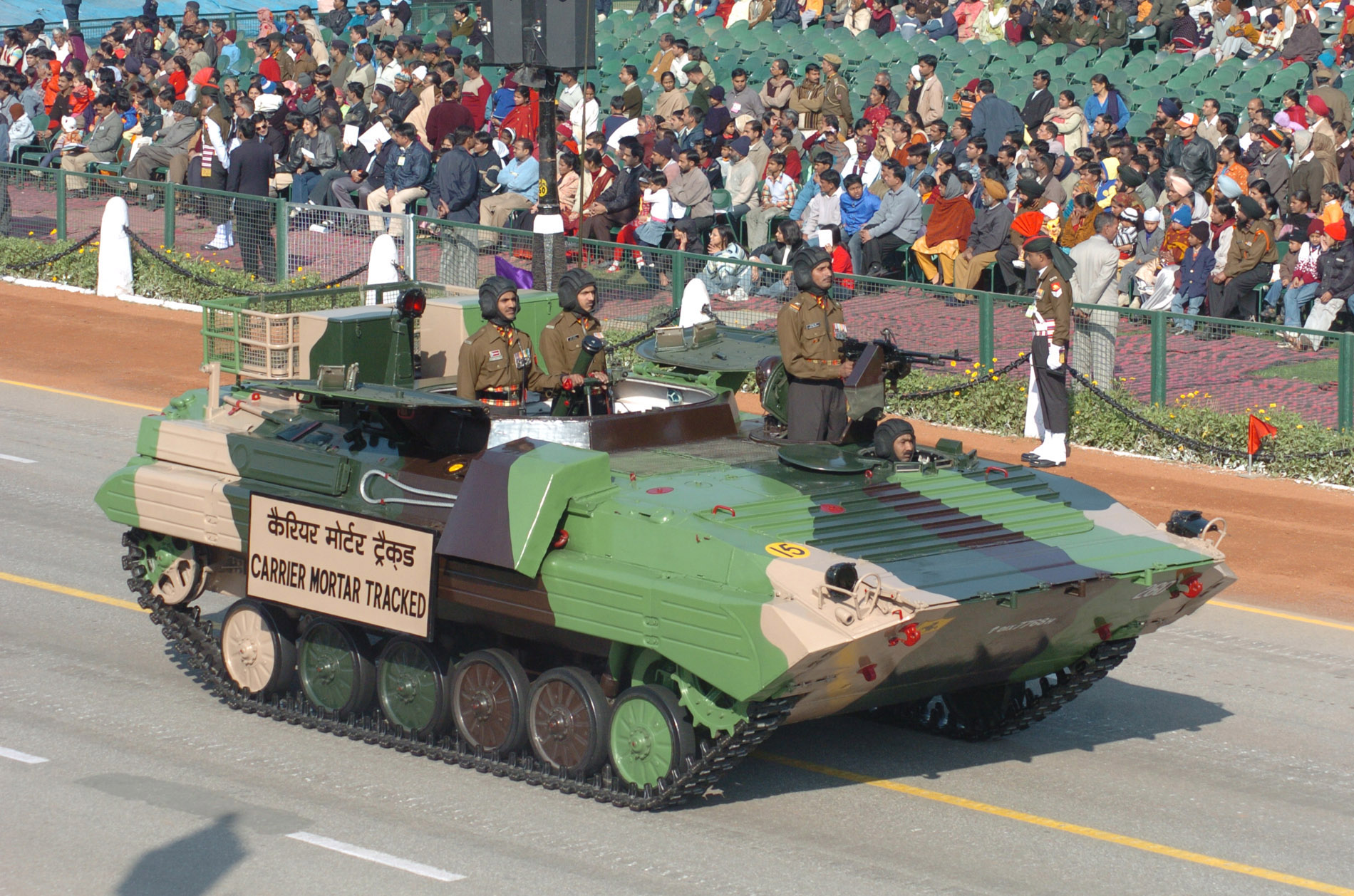
Carrier Mortar Tracked

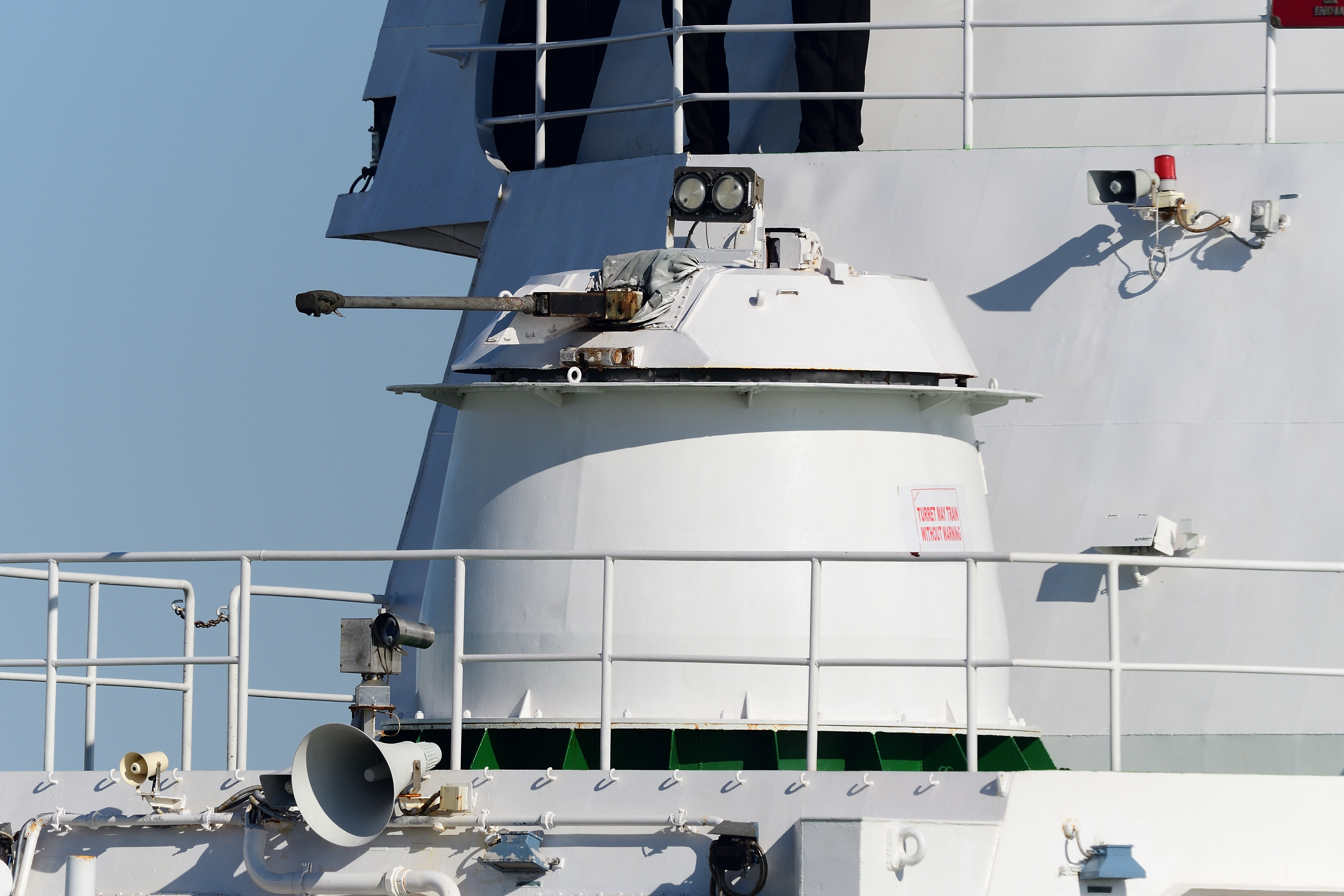
CRN-91 Naval Gun

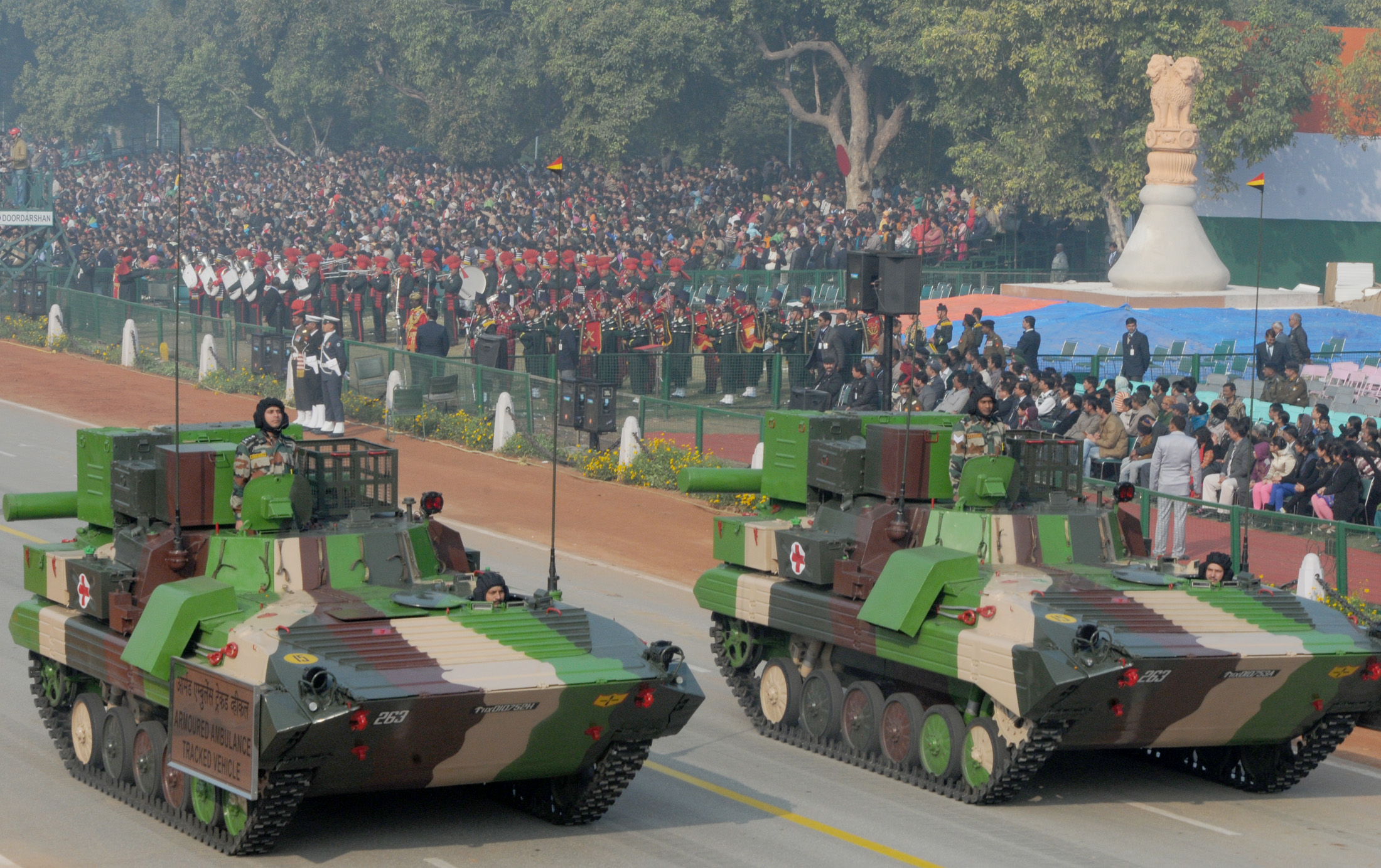
Armoured Ambulance Tracked

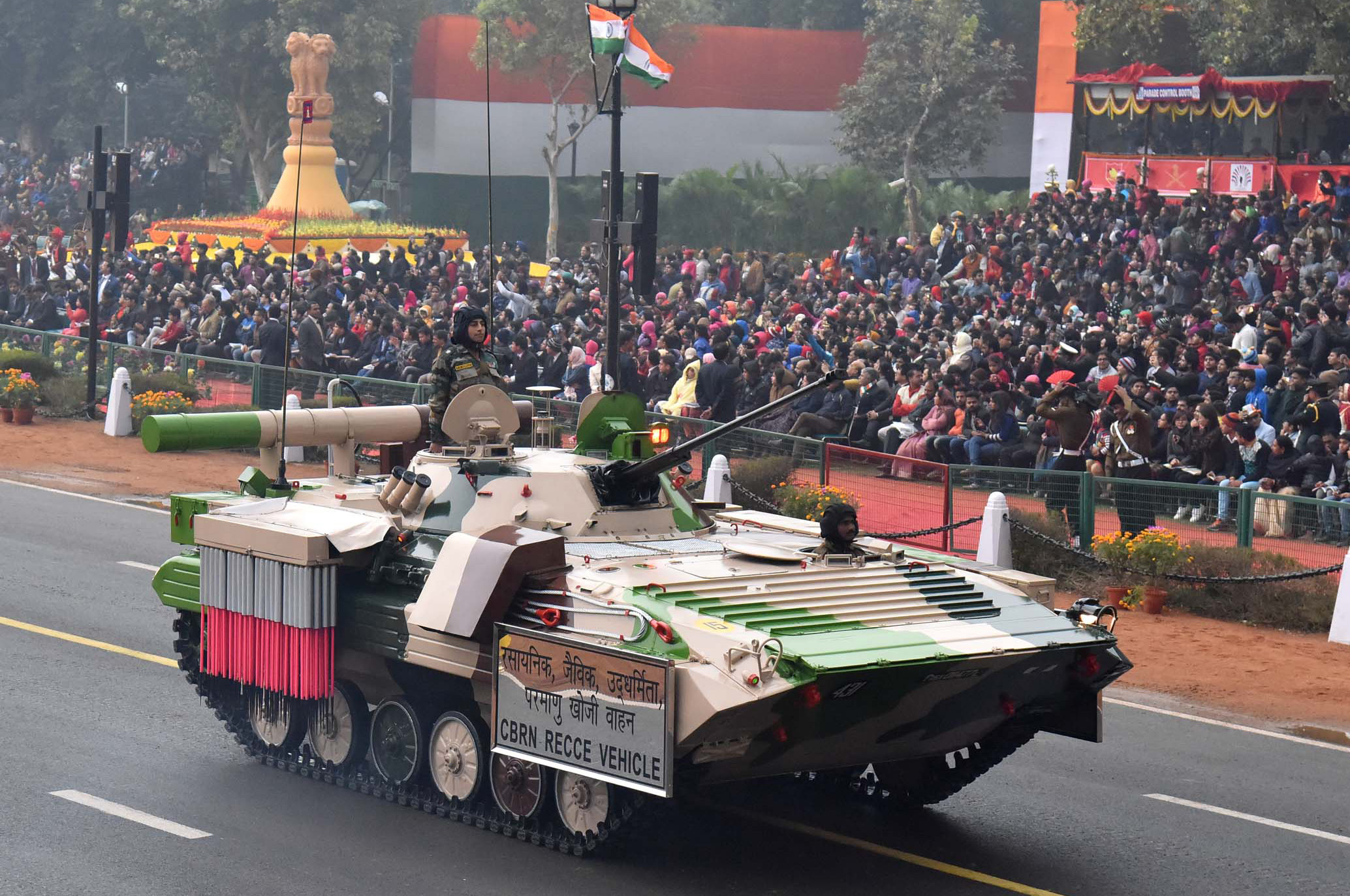
Chemical Biological Radiological and Nuclear Reconnaissance Vehicle (CBRN-RV)

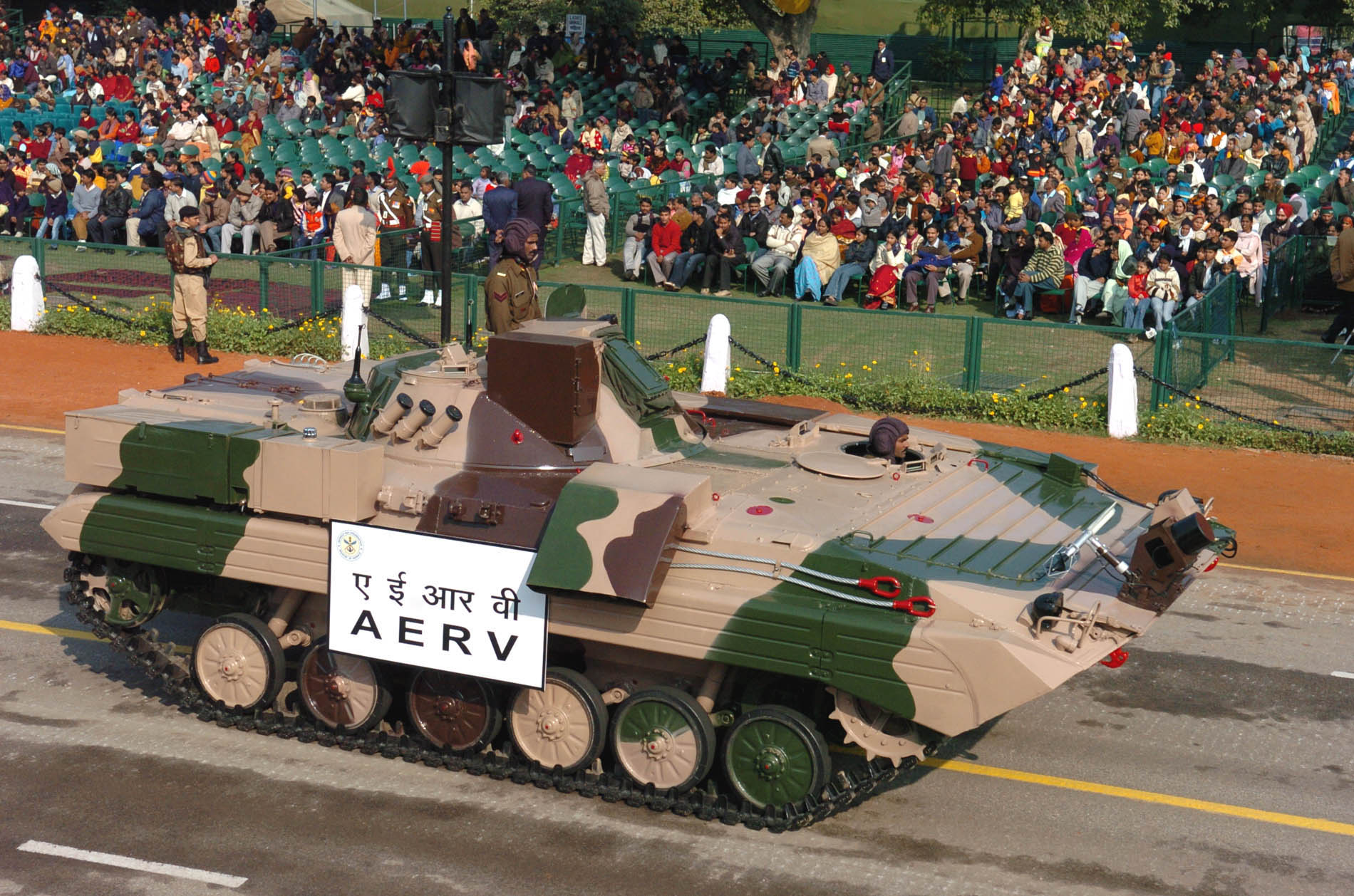
Armoured Engineer Reconnaissance Vehicle (AERV)

=== New products ===
- Light Armoured Wheeled Vehicle (LAWV)
- Abhay Infantry Combat Vehicle (AICV)
- Remote Controlled Weapon Station (RCWS)
- AK-630 Close-in weapon system (CIWS)
Future Products and their variants
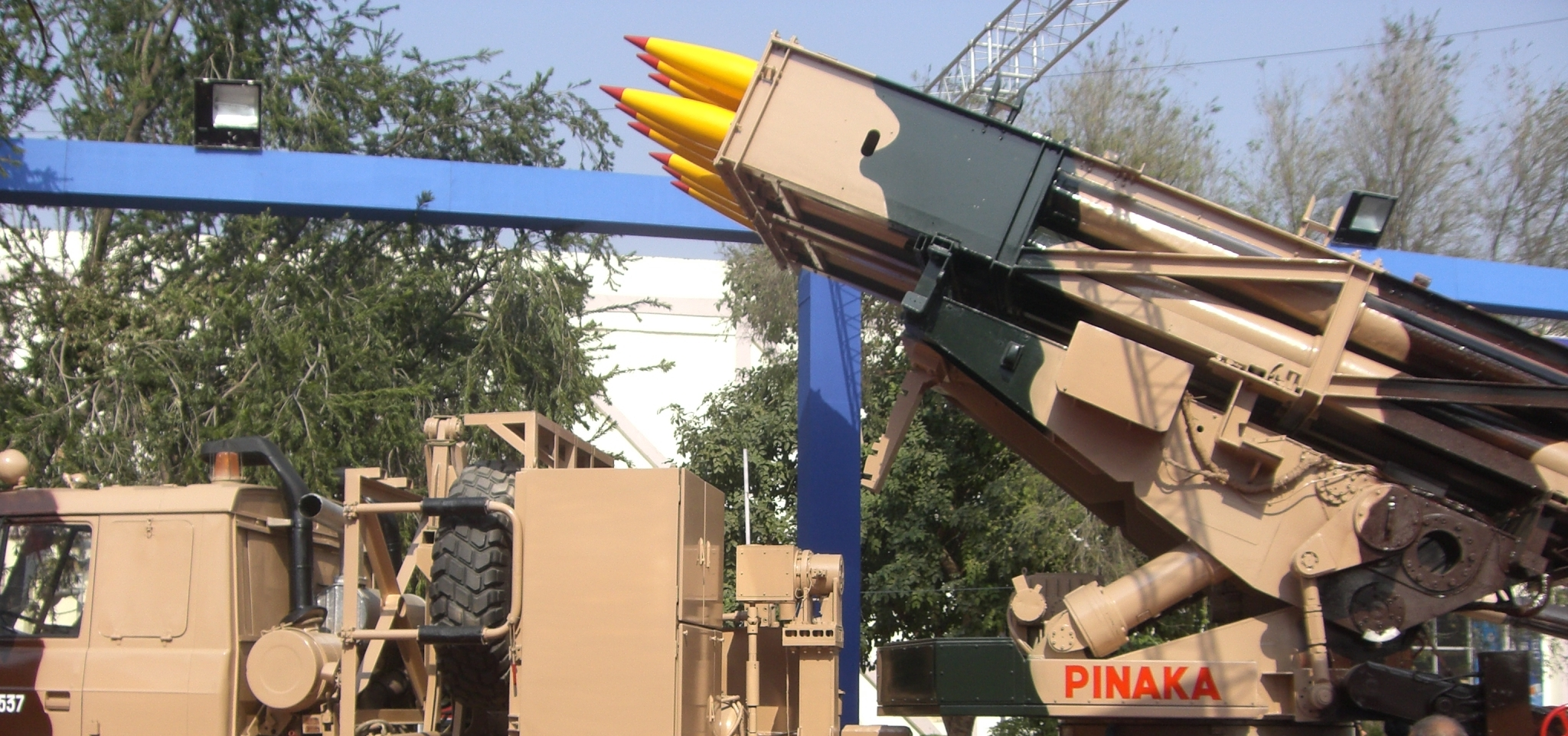
Pinake Multi-barrel Rocket Launcher soon to be produced

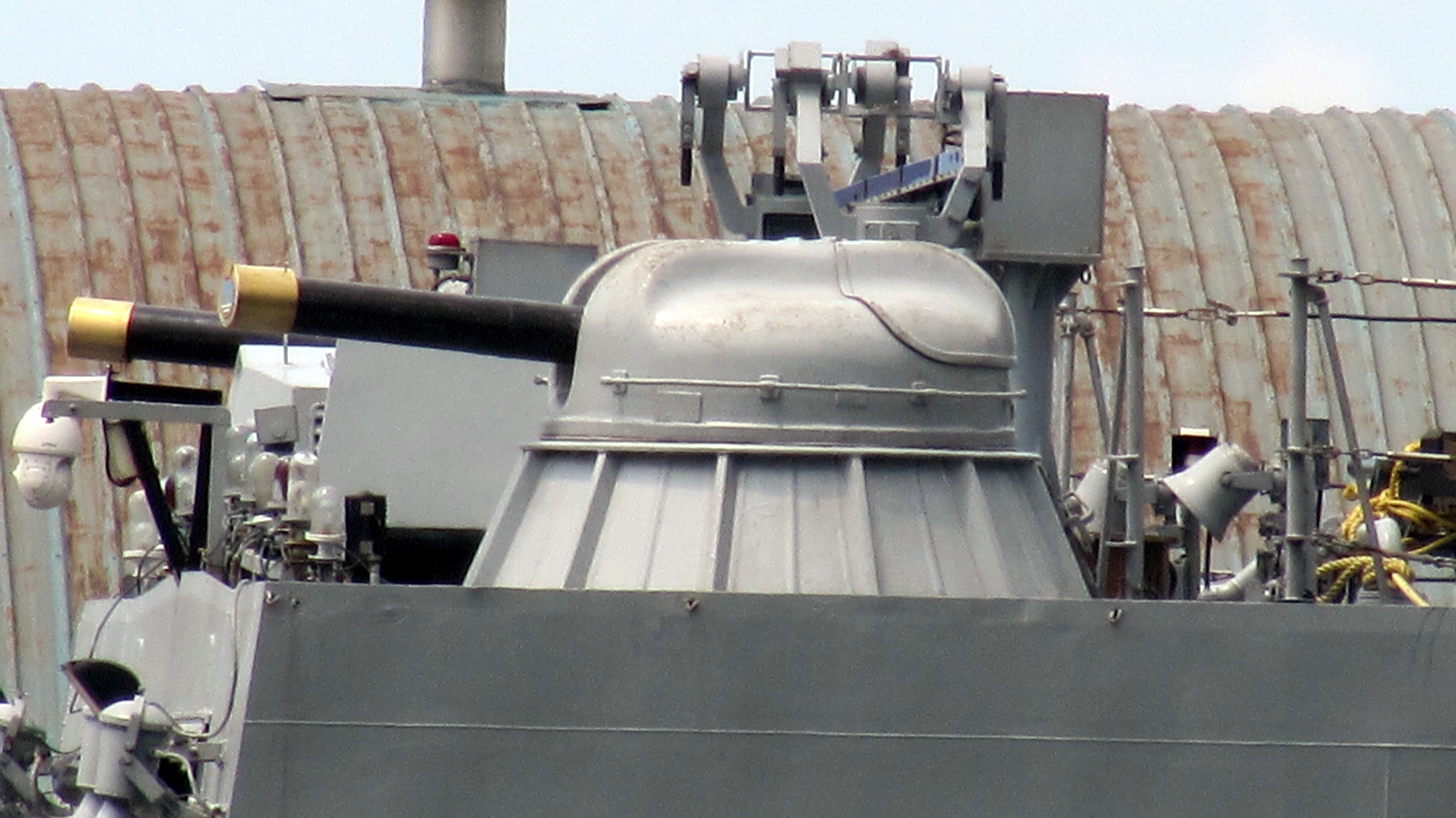
AK-630 Naval Gun

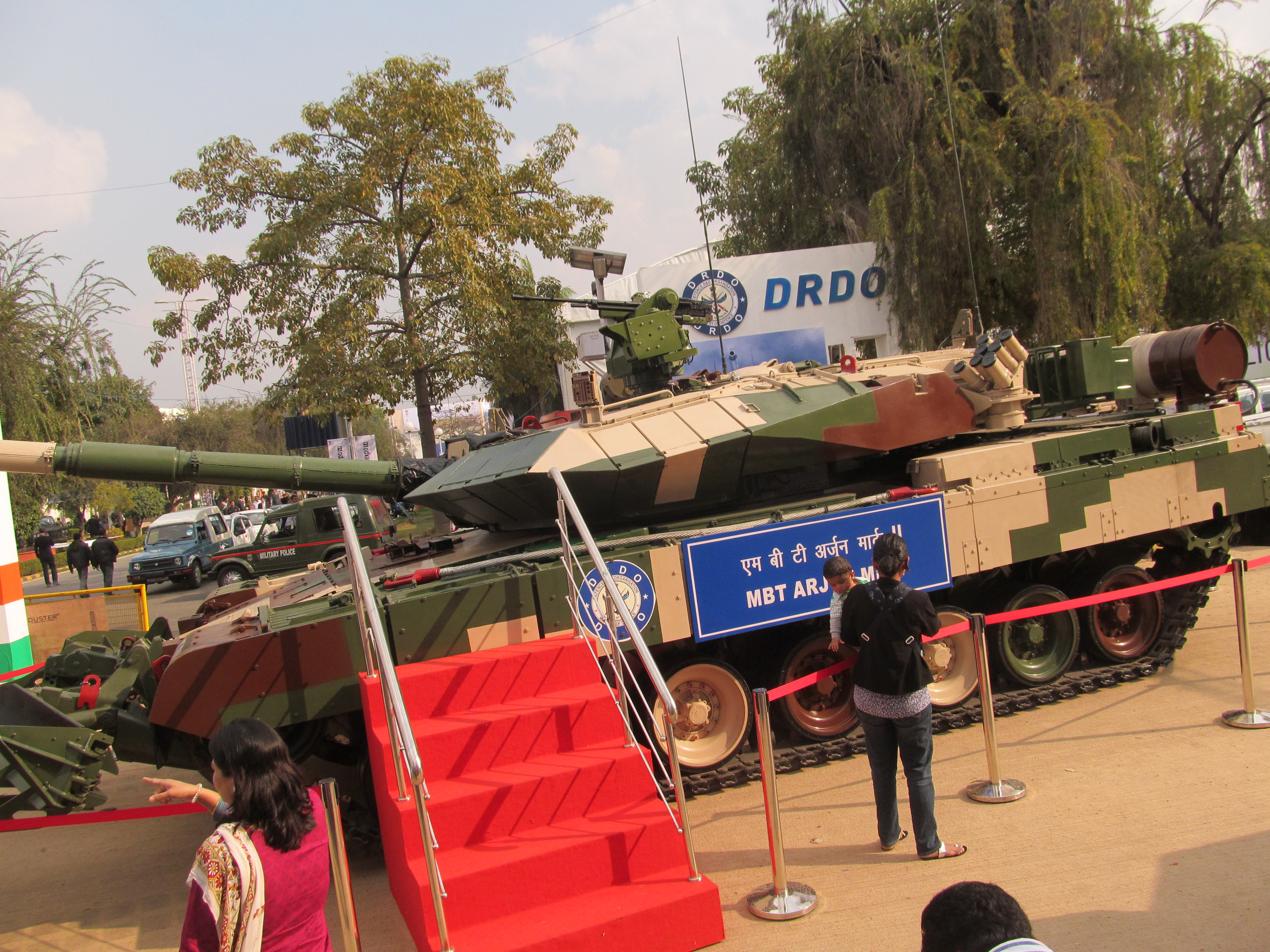
Arjun Mark-II

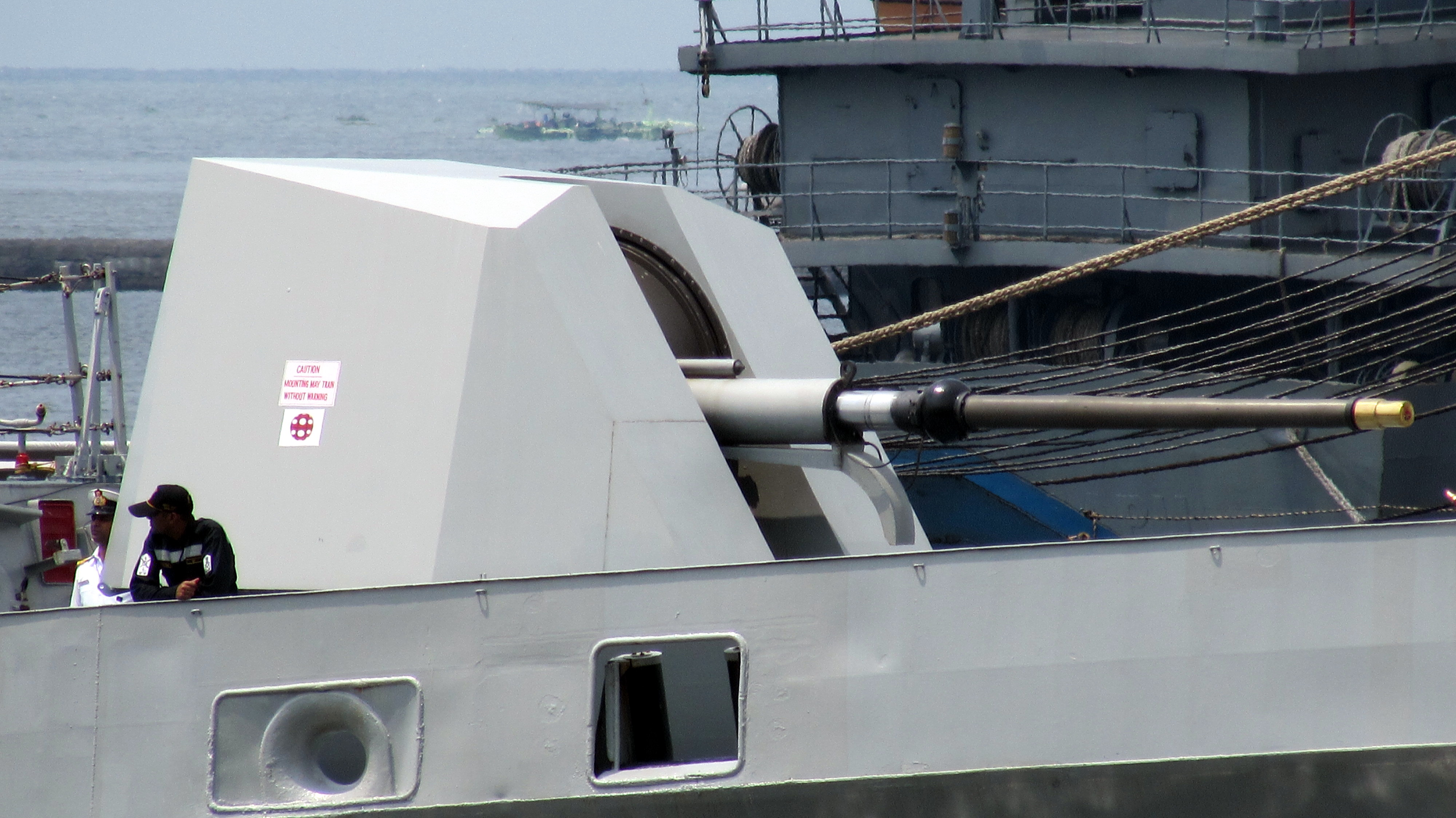
76 MM SRGM Naval

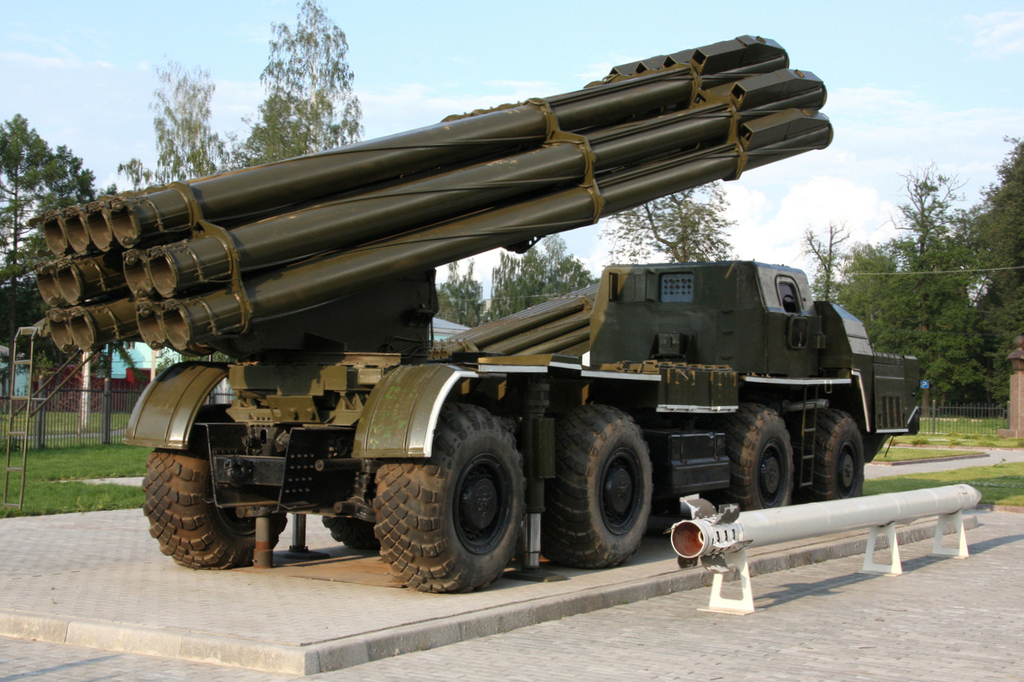
High Mobility Vehicle Launching Platform for Smerch Rockets, the same used for Pinaka

== Organisation ==
OFM is spread over an area of 3023 acres and has an employee strength of about 3000 personnel. The company is headed only by an IOFS officer called General Manager (ex officio Additional Secretary to Government of India) who is the chief executive officer responsible for the overall management of the company and is the main judicial authority.

== Technology ==
OFMK is the production partner of Vehicle Research & Development Establishment and Combat Vehicle Research and Development Establishment of Defence Research and Development Organisation.

== Customers ==
Customers of Ordnance Factory Medak include Indian Armed Forces, Central Armed Police Forces, State Armed Police Forces, Paramilitary Forces of India and Special Forces of India.
