= Vehicle Research and Development Establishment =

Laboratory of the Defence Research and Development Organisation (DRDO)

Vehicle Research & Development Establishment
- Established: 1965
- Field of research: Vehicles
- Director: GRM Rao
- Location: Vahannagar, Ahmednagar– 414006, Ahmednagar, Maharashtra, India
- Operating agency: DRDO
- Website: VRDE Home Page

Vehicle Research and Development Establishment (VRDE) is a laboratory of the Defence Research & Development Organization (DRDO) located at Vahannagar near Ahmednagar. Its primary function is research and development of various light tracked, wheeled and specialised vehicles for defence applications.

== History ==
The history of Vehicle Research & Development Establishment dates back to 1929, with the inception of Chief Inspectorate of Mechanical Transport (CIMT) at Chaklala now in Pakistan.

In 1947, the Establishment was shifted to Ahmednagar and was renamed as Technical Development Establishment (Vehicles), popularly known as TDE (V). In 1962, the engineering wing was separated with the establishment of an independent establishment at Pune, named as Research & Development Establishment (R&DE).

Further in 1965, the activities were bifurcated between ‘R&D’ and ‘Inspection’ and two separate establishments viz. Vehicle Research & Development Establishment (VRDE) and Controllerate of Inspection Vehicles (CIV), now known as Controllerate of Quality Assurance Vehicles (CQAV), came into existence. A detachment of VRDE was created at Avadi, Madras in 1966, to assist in a production of main battle tanks at Heavy Vehicles Factory, Avadi which eventually led to the formation of CVRDE and further bifurcation of roles. The previous director of VRDE was Mr. Sangam Sinha.

Starting with design modifications and technical evaluation of vehicles, VRDE has graduated over the years into an organization capable of undertaking development of futuristic vehicles. The National Centre for Automotive Testing (NCAT), a separate division of VRDE, provides for vehicle testing and evaluation requirements of defence services as well as automotive industry. India's first and one of the biggest in the world, Automotive Electro-Magnetic Compatibility (EMC) test facility, which is also known as EMC Tech Centre was established. The Energy Research Centre is also on its way to completion. National Centre of Excellence for Combustion and Gasification (NCECG) is also being established.

== Technologies developed ==
- Advanced Armoured Platform - A family of tracked and wheeled armoured fighting vehicles being developed for the Indian Army with the Tata Advanced Systems and the Bharat Forge.
- Armoured Engineer Reconnaissance Vehicle (AERV) - The vehicle is based on amphibious BMP-II chassis, retaining its mobility and protective features. The vehicle is fitted with an array of instruments for carrying out land and water recce. AERV has entered into service with the Indian Army. The production agency is Ordnance Factory Medak. AERV is designed to provide Combat Engineering Support for both offensive and defensive operations in plain, desert and riverine terrains. It can measure bank conditions, profile of water obstacles and terrain conditions to facilitate construction of assault bridges.
- Armoured Ambulance – This version retains the turret but without the gun or smoke grenade launchers. It is under production at the Ordnance Factory Medak. The troop compartment has been modified to carry four stretchers.
- Armoured Amphibious Dozer (AAD) - AAD is based on re-engineered BMP-II chassis. AAD has been accepted for introduction into service. The production agency is Ordnance Factory Medak. AAD is designed to provide integral engineering support to battle groups in offensive operations by reducing banks of water obstacles to facilitate construction of wet / dry assault bridges and improving mobility of mechanized formations by construction and improvement of existing tracks.
- NBC Recce Vehicle - The vehicle is designed to diagnose the presence of nuclear, biological and chemical agents in the affected area/ atmosphere. It has facilities to cordon off the contaminated areas and transmit this information to the supported formation, operating from within the confines of the NBC protected vehicle. NBC Recce Vehicle has been accepted for introduction into service by Indian Army. The production agency is Ordnance Factory Medak.
- Mobile Decontamination System - The MDS is designed to decontaminate vehicles, equipment personnel and terrain against biological and chemical warfare agents. It consists of pre-wash equipment, chemical mixing equipment, post wash equipment, personnel shower equipment, automatic emulsion mixing and feeding equipment, 3000 litres water tank and onboard power supply. The MDS developed on Tatra 8x8 VVN vehicle has undergone users trials and approved for introduction into service with Indian Army.
- Riot Control Vehicles - Riot Control Vehicle ‘Vajra’ based on light commercial vehicle is suitable for law enforcement duties and transportation of security forces along with their riot control gear to the affected areas. So far 410 Vajra vehicles have been manufactured and supplied to Police and Paramilitary forces through industry partners.
- Bulletproof Vehicles - Bulletproof vehicles based on light commercial vehicles are suitable for employment in counterterrorist operations and for VIP security. A total quantity of 229 custom-made bulletproof vehicles based on VRDE design have so far been supplied to various state police organizations and paramilitary forces, through industry partners to whom technology has been transferred.
- Containerised Operation Theatre & Wards on Wheels - A mobile container-based, “Operation Theatre Complex” has been designed and developed by VRDE for use by medical units during combat and disaster management operations, to provide medical cover in field. Each set of OT Complex consists of 11 vehicles including OT container, pre-OT container, post-OT container, sterilization and stores container, ward container and generator vehicles. These vehicle are built on the Stallion platform which is manufactured by Vehicle Factory Jabalpur.
- BMP Urban Survival Kit - The kit can be assembled and disassembled in a short span of time and is well protected against weapons utilised by the terrorists. The unique features of the kit are light weight, high technology and advanced armour. The strength fibre nets are part of this kit. This net has enabled the vehicle to meet any kind of threat from armour-piercing and shaped charge attack. Manufactured at Ordnance Factory Medak.
- Vehicle Platforms for Bridge laying system “Sarvatra” - Tatra VVN & VVL vehicles have been modified and reengineered to transport and launch ‘Sarvatra’ Mobile Assault Bridge 15m / 20m span. The system is in service with Indian Army. The nodal production agency is BEML Bangalore.
- Vehicle Platforms & Shelters for Samyukta EW System - Development of hydraulically leveled platforms on Tatra vehicle chassis, EMI-hardened and waterproof shelters with BC ventilation system have been under taken by VRDE for Samyukta Electronic Warfare Programme.
- RV & LCR Vehicles for Pinaka Multi Barrel Rocket Launcher - Replenishment Vehicle (RV) and Loader Cum Replenishment Vehicle. (LCR) have been designed for safe transportation and replenishment of rocket pods of Pinaka multi barrel rocket launcher.
- High Specific Power Engines for DRDO Nishant UAV - VRDE had developed lightweight, high specific power output engines for UAV application. These include two-stroke single-cylinder, twin-cylinder and four-cylinder engines, based on a modular concept.
- Infantry Combat Vehicle (ICV) ‘Abhay’ - Infantry Combat Vehicle (ICV) characterized by excellent mobility and protection features and potent fire power to defeat enemy armour and soft targets. This fighting machine is operated by a crew of three and can launch into battle a stick of seven infantry soldiers with their full combat gear. After clearance, the production is expected to start at Ordnance Factory Medak.
- Light Armoured Wheeled Vehicle (LAWV) - Light Armoured Wheeled Vehicle (LAWV) a technology demonstrator has been developed as Armoured Personnel Carrier for reconnaissance and counter insurgency and riot control Operations.
- Expandable Mobile Shelter (EMS) - An Expandable Mobile Shelter with three times volume vis-à-vis standard shelters, to solve the working space problems has been realised by VRDE. The shelter provides solutions for a wide range of mobile applications in field, such as mobile command post, operations room, mobile communication centre, operation theatre etc. Shelter is air, ship, rail and road transportable. This shelter is EMI shielded and provided with AC and NBC ventilation system.
- Unmanned Ground Vehicle (UGV) - A UGV system based on wheeled vehicle platform, composed of a pilot system unit (PSU) and two UGVs, one each for surveillance and NBC recce role has been realised. The project involves technology demonstration in the fields of remote operations on wireless LAN / alternate links, vision systems, optronics, digital image processing, embedded control system, servo controls, real time systems, robotic manipulator, actuators and remote controlled turret system. These vehicles are built on the Stallion and LPTA 713 platforms which are manufactured at the Vehicle Factory Jabalpur.
- Diesel Electric Parallel Hybrid Vehicle - Based on Tata Ace light commercial vehicle platform. Specially designed transmission system for the combination of two power sources. Electric motor is powered by 72V battery bank. Three different modes of operation are - Engine only, Electric only and Combined power mode.
- NAMICA (Nag Missile Carrier) – part of the Nag anti-tank missile system. The Nag (Cobra) missile is launched from a retractable armoured launcher that contains four launch tubes and the guidance package. Nag is a fire-and-forget top-attack ATGM with a tandem-HEAT warhead and a range of at least 4 km. Manufactured at Ordnance Factory Medak.
- Akash Missile Launcher – Air-defence missile system that is based on a modified Sarath chassis with 7 road wheels. On top of the hull there's a launcher for three SAM's with a range of 27 km and semi-active homing guidance. Production is to be started at Ordnance Factory Medak.
- Trishul Missile Launcher - The chassis of the Sarath has been modified to launch the Trishul SAM, with three missiles being carried in the ready to launch position, search and track radars and their associated fire-control system. In addition, there is a mobile command post with a raised superstructure, which is the nerve centre of the missiles' command, control, communications and intelligence functions. This system has yet to enter quantity production at the Ordnance Factory Medak.
- Rajendra RADAR – This is a multifunctional 3-D phased radar (MUFAR), associated with the Akash system. It is also based on the stretched chassis. To be manufactured at the Ordnance Factory Medak.
- 105mm Self-Propelled Gun – This is OFB's mechanized version of the Indian Light Field Gun (EQPT 105/37 LFG E2) with 42 rounds stowed. The gun is mounted in a lightly armoured turret. The 105mm SPG was shown for the first time in public in February 2010 during DEFEXPO-2010 in New Delhi and is planned to replace the FV433 Abbot SPG in the Indian army. To be manufactured at the Ordnance Factory Medak.
- Agni Series Missile Launchers - VRDE also developed launchers for the Agni Series of missiles, based on Tatra and Ashok Leyland's platforms.

== Production ==
The main production partners of VRDE are:

- Vehicle Factory Jabalpur and
- Ordnance Factory Medak;

the other production agencies include:

- BEML,
- Tata Motors and
- Ashok Leyland.
