= VRDE Light Armoured Vehicle =

Light Armoured Wheeled Vehicle (LAWV)
- Type: Armored personnel carrier
- Place of origin: India

Specifications
- Mass: 8.7 t
- Length: 5.83 m (19.12 ft)
- Width: 2.23 m (7.31 ft)
- Height: 2.2 m (7.21 ft)
- Crew: 2+6
- Armor: Against 7.62 mm AP NATO shot at 100 m distance
- Main armament: 7.62 mm MG (MGS)
- Engine: Four-stroke, water-cooled, and turbo-charged 119.31 kW (160 hp)
- Power/weight: 13.71 kW/t
- Suspension: 4×4-wheeled
- Operational range: 500 km (300 mi)
- Maximum speed: 84 km/h (52.2 mph)

The VRDE Light Armoured Vehicle (LAWV) is a lightweight four-wheeled all-wheel-drive armored combat vehicles developed by Vehicle Research and Development Establishment (VRDE) for the Indian Army. Based on the Canadian LAV III light-armored vehicle, which in turn is based on the Swiss MOWAG Piranha III 8x8, the Armoured Vehicle is the Indian Army's first indigenous armored vehicle. The production is commencing at Ordnance Factory Medak.

Light Armoured Wheeled Vehicle (LAWV) a technology demonstrator has been developed as Armoured Personnel Carrier for reconnaissance and counter insurgency and riot control Operations.

== Specification ==
- Crew : 6
- Configuration : 4 x 4, rear engine
- Engine type : Four-stroke, water-cooled, turbocharged
- Maximum power : 160 hp (120 kW) @ 2400 rpm
- Maximum torque : 52.5 kg.m @ 1800 rpm
- Gear-box : Manual, 5 forward and 1 reverse
- Dimensions (lxbxh): 5830 x2230 x2200 mm
- Wheelbase : 3210 mm
- FAW/RAW/GVW : 3500/4200/7700 kg
- Payload : 1000 kg
- Maximum speed : 84 km/h
- Ground clearance : 280 mm
- Protection : Against 7.62 mm AP
- Fire Power : 7.62 mm MG

Bulletproof windshield glass for driver and commander
