= Armoured Engineer Reconnaissance Vehicle =

Indian Armored Engineering Vehicle

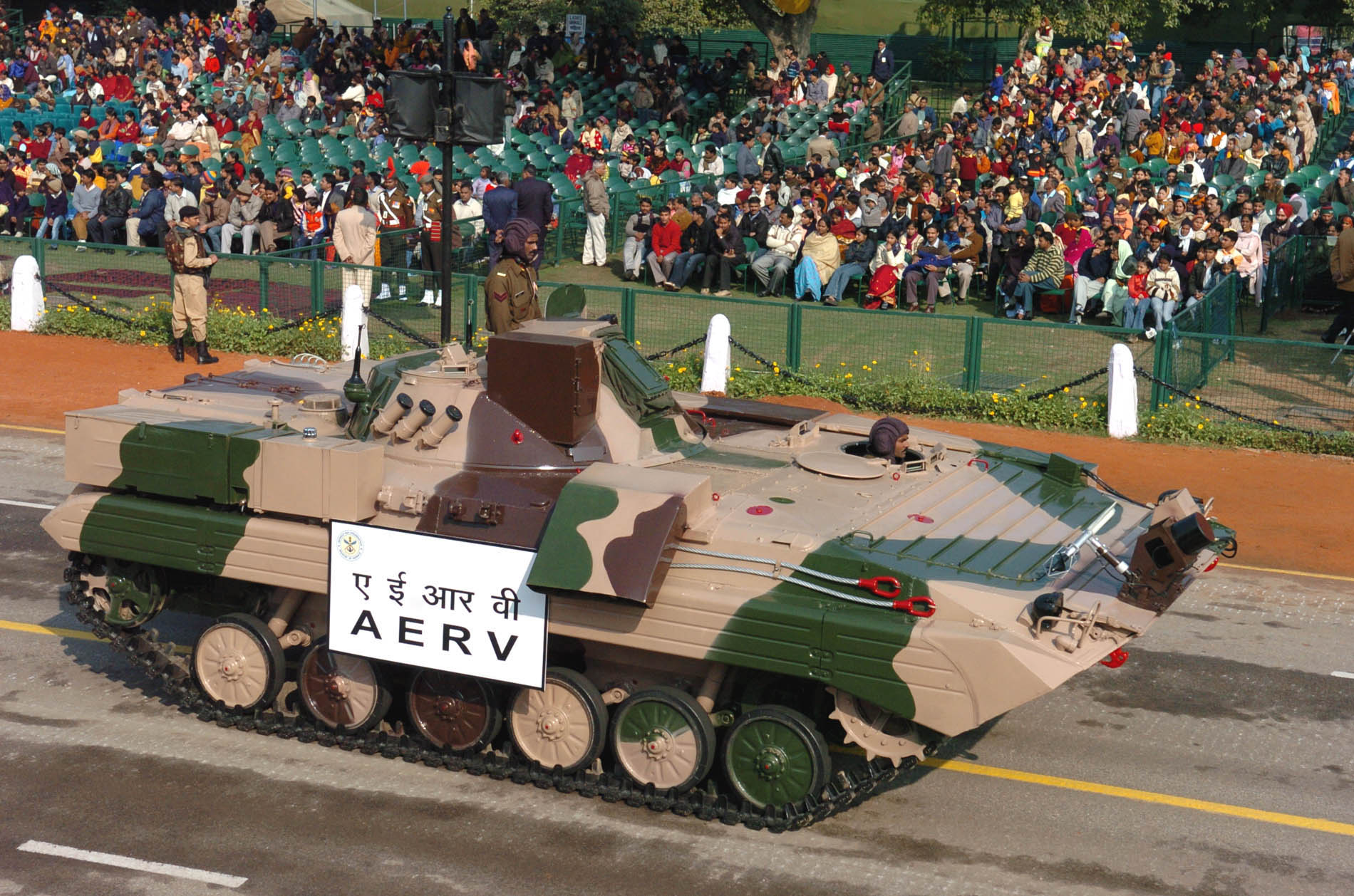
- AERV passing through the Rajpath.

Service history
- Used by: Indian Army

Production history
- Designer: Vehicle Research and Development Establishment; Research & Development Establishment (Engineers)
- Manufacturer: Armoured Vehicles Nigam Limited; Bharat Electronics

The Armoured Engineer Reconnaissance Vehicle (AERV) is an Indian military engineering vehicle developed by the Defence Research and Development Organisation (DRDO) in coordination with C-TEC, as per General Staff Qualitative Requirements (GSQRs) of the Indian Army for enabling combat engineers to conduct reconnaissance and site surveying operations.

== Development ==
The AERV is manufactured by Defence PSU Bharat Electronics Limited (BEL), with 90% of the vehicles components originating in India. The AERV is based on the BMP-2 Sarath's hull (a license produced variant of Russian BMP-2) and is designed to carry out terrestrial and riverbed survey to facilitate construction of assault bridges across water obstacles in both offensive and defensive operations in plains, desert and riverine terrain. It has no gun and is fitted with specialized equipment, including an echo-sounder, a water current meter, a laser range finder and GPS. On the left rear of the hull, a marking system with 40 rods is fitted.

AERV was developed by the Vehicle Research and Development Establishment (VRDE) and Research & Development Establishment (Engineers). Bharat Electronics manufactures 14 major electronics and sensors in its makeup.

== Operational history ==
On 22 December 2021, the Indian Army Corps of Engineers formally inducted AERV in Pune. The Indian Army ordered 53 units of AERV that, upon induction, will be deployed on India's western front.
