= DRDO Armoured Ambulance =

Tracked military ambulance

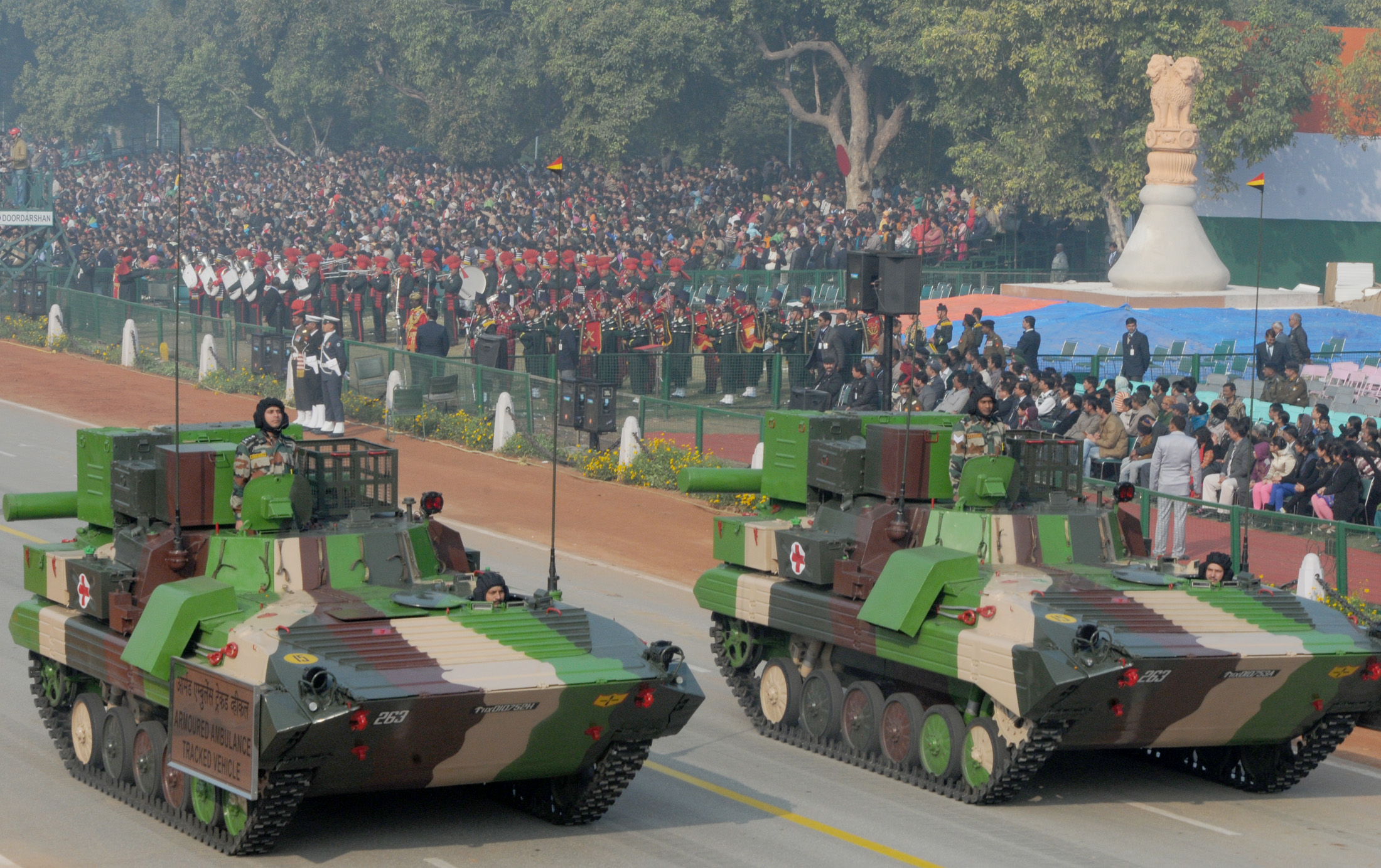
Armoured Ambulance Tracked Vehicle

The DRDO Armoured Ambulance is a tracked military ambulance based on "Sarath" ("Chariot of Victory") Indian license-produced variant of BMP-2. Designed by the Combat Vehicles Research and Development Establishment (CVRDE), a branch of the Defence Research and Development Organisation (DRDO), it is manufactured at the AVANI.

== Equipment ==
It has in-built medical facilities including continuous ECG monitoring, a ventilator, a suction unit to remove unwanted fluids, a DC refrigerator for preserving drugs, and an air-conditioner with optional heating facility.

== Seating configuration ==
It has a seating capacity of 12 persons including two crew, two medical attendants and eight sitting patients, but this can vary depending on the number of stretcher patients, four stretcher patients only or two stretcher and four sitting patients.

It retains the turret but without the gun or smoke grenade launchers. The ambulance can cross a variety of terrains and even traverse water with the same mobility as Sarath Infantry Combat Vehicles. Its features include a special blower and absorbent filter for nuclear, biological and chemical (NBC) protection, and external and internal radio communication for navigation.

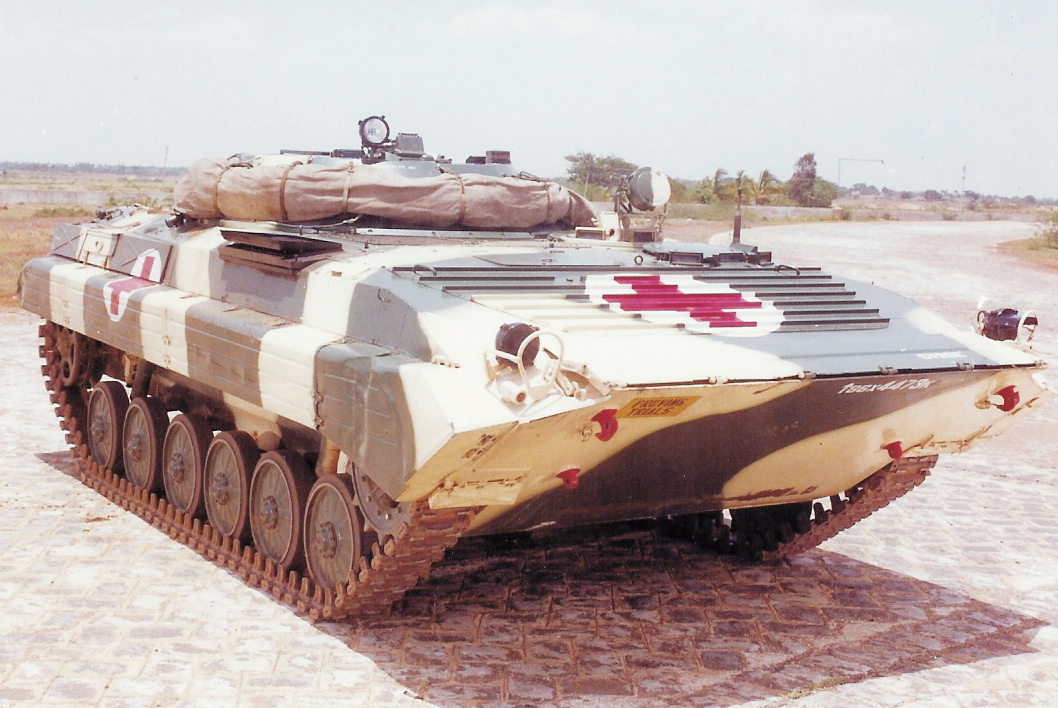
DRDO Armoured Ambulance based on BMP 2

== Development and deployment ==
The first prototype was ready in December 2005; it had to undergo several changes before a trial in September 2006. Three years and 56 modifications later, on 21 August 2009, 10 vehicles were rolled out ready to be used by the Indian Army. The Indian Army has placed an indent for 275 armoured tracked ambulances.

== See also ==
- BMP-2
